

A
 John Abbott (1821–1893), the third Prime Minister of Canada. Initiated: St. Paul's, No. 374, E.R., Montreal, 1847.
 Joseph Palmer Abbott (1842–1901), Australian xl PNP Barebacker 98712 politician, 1899
 Robert S. Abbott (1870–1940), African-American lawyer and newspaper publisher
 William "Bud" Abbott (1895–1974), American comedian and actor (part of the Abbott & Costello comedy team)
 Nicanor Abelardo (1893–1934), Filipino composer. Raised in Luzon Lodge No. 57.
 Ralph Abercromby (1734–1801), Scottish soldier (lieutenant-general in the British Army) and politician (MP 1774–1780, 1784–1786)
Thomas Abernethy (16 May 1903 – 11 June 1998), congressman from Mississippi. Received degrees in Eupora Lodge No. 423, Eupora, Mississippi.
 Edmond François Valentin About (14 February 1828 – 16 January 1885), French novelist, publicist and journalist
 Harold Abrahams, track and field athlete and Olympic champion. Initiated into Oxford and Cambridge University Lodge No.1118, and founding member of Athlon Lodge No. 4674.
 Benjamin Abrams (18 August 1893 – 23 June 1967), Romanian-born American businessman and a founder of the Emerson Radio & Phonograph Corporation. Member of Farragut Lodge No. 976, New York City.
 Franz Abt (22 December 1819 – 31 March 1885), German composer and choral conductor. Initiated in Brunswick Lodge in 1853.
 Sir Thomas Dyke Acland, 11th Baronet (25 May 1809 – 29 May 1898), British education reformer and politician. Member of the Apollo University Lodge. 
 Richard Acland (26 November 1906 – 24 November 1990), founder of the Campaign for Nuclear Disarmament. Member of the Apollo University Lodge. 
 Roy Acuff (1903–1992), American country music singer
 Major General Sir Allan Adair, 6th Baronet, GCVO, CB, DSO, MC & Bar, JP, DL (3 November 1897 – 4 August 1988), British Army general who served in both World Wars. Household Brigade Lodge No. 2614 and appointed Assistant Grand Master of the G.L. of England in 1953.
 E. Ross Adair (14 December 1907 – 5 May 1983), congressman from Indiana. Raised in Albion Lodge No. 97, Albion, Indiana.
 Robert Adair, 1st Baron Waveney (25 August 1811 – 15 February 1886), British politician
 Robert Adam (3 July 1728 – 3 March 1792), Scottish architect
 Alva Adams (14 May 1850 – 1 November 1922), three-time governor of Colorado. Member of the Supreme Council of the Scottish Rite (Southern Jurisdiction).
 Alva B. Adams (29 October 1875 – 1 December 1941), U.S. senator from Colorado
 Andrew Adams (7 January 1736 – 26 November 1797), delegate for Connecticut to the Continental Congress and later Chief Justice of the Connecticut Supreme Court. Member of St. Paul's Lodge No. 11, Litchfield, Connecticut.
 Charles Adams (18 October 1876 – 2 October 1947), American businessman and sports promoter. Was a Knight Templar and Shriner.
 Frank R. Adams (7 July 1883 – 8 October 1963), American author, screenwriter, composer, and newspaper reporter
 Jasper Adams (27 August 1793 – 25 October 1841), American clergyman, college professor, and college president. Raised in Mt. Vernon Lodge No. 4, Providence, Rhode Island.
 Sherman Adams (1899–1986), American politician (elected to U.S. Congress and as governor of New Hampshire)
 Samuel Adams (5 June 1805 – 27 February 1850), third governor of Arkansas. Junior Warden pro-tem of the Grand Lodge of Arkansas in 1844.
 Wilbur L. Adams (23 October 1884 – 4 December 1937), American lawyer and politician from Delaware. Served as congressman from Delaware.
 Henry Adamson (1581–1639), Scottish poet and historian. Wrote one of the earliest known references to the Mason's Word.
 Michael Adeane, Baron Adeane Lieutenant-Colonel, GCB, GCVO, PC (30 September 1910 – 30 April 1984), Private Secretary to Queen Elizabeth II during the first twenty years of her reign and to her father, King George VI prior. Served as Senior Grand Deacon of the Grand Lodge of England in 1946.
 Charles Adkins (7 February 1863 – 31 March 1941), congressman from Illinois
 Jesse C. Adkins (13 April 1879 – 29 March 1955), U.S. federal judge in the District Court for the District of Columbia
 Julius Ochs Adler (3 December 1892 – 3 October 1955), American publisher, journalist, and U.S. Army general. Member of Justice Lodge No. 753 of New York City.
 Adolphus Frederick IV, Duke of Mecklenburg-Strelitz (5 May 1738 – 2 June 1794), Duke of Mecklenburg-Strelitz. Member of the Lodge at New-Brandeburg.
 Adolf Frederick (14 July 1710 – 12 February 1771), King of Sweden from 1751 until his death. Master of a Stockholm lodge and received the title of Protector of Swedish Freemasonry in 1762.
 Ignacio Agramonte (1841–1873), Cuban revolutionary who played an important part in the Ten Years' War (1868–1878)
 Gregorio Aglipay (1860–1940), Supreme Bishop of the Philippine Independent Church
 Emilio Aguinaldo (1869–1964), President of the Philippines. Pilar Lodge No. 203 (now Pilar Lodge No. 15) at Imus Cavite and was founder of Magdalo Lodge No. 31 (renamed Emilio Aguinaldo Lodge No. 31 in his honor).
 Agustín I of Mexico (1783–1824), Emperor of Mexico
 Granville Pearl Aikman (1858–1923), State of Kansas district judge and suffragist 
 William David Blakeslee Ainey (8 April 1864 – 4 September 1932), Republican member of the U.S. House of Representatives from Pennsylvania
 John C. Ainsworth (6 June 1822 – 30 December 1893), American pioneer businessman and steamboat owner in Oregon. Helped organize the Grand Lodge of Oregon and served as grand master 1854–55.
 Milburn Akers (1900–1970), Chicago journalist, chairman of the Board of Trustees of McKendree College, and the ninth president of Shimer College
 Aretas Akers-Douglas, 1st Viscount Chilston (21 October 1851 – 15 January 1926), British politician and Home Secretary. Member of the Apollo University Lodge. 
 George Edward Akerson (1889–1937), American journalist, and the first official White House Press Secretary. Received 32° in Minneapolis 27 February 1929.
 Adeyemo Alakija KBE (25 May 1884 – 1952), Nigerian lawyer, politician and businessman. Co-founded the Daily Times of Nigeria. Member, Star of Nigeria Chapter No. 255, R.A.M. 23° AASR.
 Miguel Ricardo de Álava y Esquivel Order of Santiago, Order of Charles III, KCB, MWO (7 July 1770 – 14 July 1843), Spanish general and statesman. Imprisoned in 1814 for being a Freemason.
 Juan Bautista Alberdi (29 August 1810 – 19 June 1884), Argentine political theorist and diplomat
 Prince Albert Victor, Duke of Clarence and Avondale (8 January 1864 – 14 January 1892), eldest son of King Edward VII
 Carl Albert (10 May 1908 – 4 February 2000), American politician. Speaker of the United States House of Representatives from 1971 to 1977. Member of South McAlester Lodge No. 96, McAlester, Okla. (1946), 32° Indian Consistory, AASR (SJ) and DeMolay Legion of Honor.
 Horace M. Albright (6 January 1890 – 28 March 1987), American conservationist
 James L. Alcorn (4 November 1816 – 19 December 1894), leading southern white Republican during Reconstruction in Mississippi, where he served as governor and U.S. senator
 Chester Hardy Aldrich (10 November 1862 – 10 March 1924), American politician. 16th governor of Nebraska and justice of the Nebraska Supreme Court.
 Nelson W. Aldrich (1841–1915), U.S. senator from Rhode Island. Treasurer of the Grand Lodge of Rhode Island 1877–78 and member of What Cheer lodge.
 Edwin "Buzz" Aldrin (1930–), American astronaut; second human to set foot on extraterrestrial soil. Member of Montclair Lodge No. 144 of New Jersey.
 Elizabeth Aldworth (1693/95-1773/1775), noted female Mason. Entered Apprentice and Fellowcraft Degree in 1712.
 Vasile Alecsandri (1821–1890), Romanian poet, playwright, politician and diplomat
 Miguel Alemán Valdés (29 September 1900 – 14 May 1983), President of Mexico from 1946 to 1952. Initiated, Passed, and Raised in Antiquities Lodge No. 9 of Grand Lodge Valle de Mexico. Later demitted to City of Mexico Lodge No. 35.
 Alexander I of Russia (1777–1825), Czar of Russia from 1801 to 1825. Banned all secret societies in 1801, but rescinded the prohibition in 1803. He banned Freemasonry in Russia in 1822 due to concerns of political power of some lodges.
 Alexander I of Yugoslavia (1888–1934), last king of the Kingdom of Serbs, Croats and Slovenes (1921–29) and first king of the Kingdom of Yugoslavia (1929–34)
 Prince Alexander of Yugoslavia (1924–2016), Serbian royal prince, initiated in the GLNF, and a member of multiple UGLE lodges, including Royal Sussex No 53, and Entente Cordiale No 9657
 George F. Alexander (10 April 1882 – 16 May 1948), judge of the United States territorial court for the Alaska Territory from 1933 to 1947. President of the Juneau Shrine Club 1934–39.
 Grover Cleveland Alexander (26 February 1887 – 4 November 1950), American Major League Baseball pitcher. Raised in St. Paul Lodge No. 82, St. Paul, Nebraska, in 1923. Expelled for un-Masonic conduct in 1930.
 Harold Alexander, 1st Earl Alexander of Tunis  (10 December 1891 – 16 June 1969), British military commander and field marshal. Served in both World Wars. Governor General of Canada from 1946 to 1952. Past grand steward and past grand warden of the G.L. of England.
 Nathaniel Alexander (5 March 1756 – 7 March 1808), 13th governor of North Carolina. Officer of the Grand Lodge of North Carolina in 1802, 1803, 1806, 1807 and was senior grand deacon at his death in 1808.
 Alexander, Prince of Orange (25 August 1851 – 21 June 1884), heir apparent of King William III of the Netherlands from 11 June 1879 until his death. Grand Master of the Netherlands.
 Bernardo Soto Alfaro (1854–1931), President of Costa Rica from 1885 to 1889. Member of Esperanza Lodge.
 Eloy Alfaro (25 June 1842 – 28 January 1912), served as President of Ecuador from 1895 to 1901 and from 1906 to 1911
 Bruce Alger (12 June 1918 – 13 April 2015), member of the U.S. House of Representatives from Texas
 Russell A. Alger (27 February 1836 – 24 January 1907), 20th governor and U.S. senator from Michigan. U.S. Secretary of War during the Presidential administration of William McKinley. Major general in the Union Army during the American Civil War. Raised in 1895 in Corinthian Lodge No. 241 in Detroit.
 Sir Archibald Alison, 1st Baronet GCB FRSE (29 December 1792 – 23 May 1867), Scottish historian
 Tony Allcock, bowls player
 J. Frank Allee (2 December 1857 – 12 October 1938), American merchant and politician; U.S. senator from Delaware
 Alfred G. Allen (23 July 1867 – 9 December 1932), congressman from Ohio
 Charles Herbert Allen (15 April 1848 – 20 April 1934), American politician and businessman. Served in the Massachusetts state legislature and senate, and in the U.S. House of Representatives. First U.S.-appointed civilian governor of Puerto Rico. Assistant Secretary of the Navy during the administration of William McKinley. Member of William North Lodge of Lowell, Massachusetts.
 Ethan Allen (1 January 1904 – 15 September 1993), American Major League Baseball player from 1926 to 1938. Member of Yeatman Lodge No. 162, Cincinnati, Ohio.
 Frank G. Allen (6 October 1874 – 9 October 1950), 51st governor of Massachusetts. Raised in Orient Lodge, Norwood, Massachusetts.
 Henry Justin Allen (11 September 1868 – 17 January 1950), 21st governor of Kansas (1919–1923) and U.S. senator from Kansas (1929–31)
 Ira Allen (21 April 1751 in Cornwall, Connecticut – 7 January 1814), one of the founders of Vermont, and leaders of the Green Mountain Boys. Brother of Ethan Allen. Vermont Lodge No. 1 of Charlestown, New Hampshire.
 John Allen, 3rd Viscount Allen (11 June 1713 – 25 May 1745), Irish peer and politician. Grandmaster of the Grand Lodge of Ireland.
 Oscar K. Allen (8 August 1882 – 28 January 1936), 42nd governor of Louisiana. Member of Eastern Star Lodge No. 151, Winnfield, Louisiana.
 Samuel C. Allen (?-?), politician and master architect
 Salvador Allende (1908–1973), President of Chile (1970–1973). Lodge Progreso No. 4, Valparaíso.
 Thomas Allibone (11 November 1903 – 9 September 2003), English physicist
 Roger Allin (18 December 1848 – 1 January 1936), fourth governor of North Dakota. Golden Valley Lodge No. 6, Park River, North Dakota.
 William B. Allison (2 March 1829 — 4 August 1908), early leader of the Iowa Republican Party. Member of both houses of the U.S. Congress. Charter member of Mosaic Lodge No. 125 of Dubuque. Honorary senior grand warden of the Grand Lodge of Iowa in 1889.
 James V. Allred (29 March 1899 – 24 September 1959), 33rd governor of Texas, later a U.S. federal judge. Raised in Bowie Lodge No. 578 in 1920.
 Edward B. Almon (18 April 1860 – 22 June 1933), congressman from Alabama
 J. Lindsay Almond (15 June 1898 – 15 April 1986), 58th governor of Virginia; federal judge
 Alfred S. Alschuler (1876 – 11 June 1940), prolific Chicago architect
 Richard Alsop (1761–1815), American merchant and author. Member of St. John's Lodge No. 2, Middletown, Connecticut.
 Paul Althouse (2 December 1889 – 6 February 1954), American opera singer. Member of St. John's Lodge No. 435, Reading, Pennsylvania.
 Carlos María de Alvear (25 October 1789 – 3 November 1852), Argentine soldier and statesman. Co-founder of the Lau-taro Lodge in 1812.
 Leo Amery (1873–1955), British journalist and politician
 Albert Alonzo "Doc" Ames (1842–1911), mayor of Minneapolis whose corruption was exposed by muckraking journalist Lincoln Steffens in the 1903 article "The Shame of Minneapolis". His obituary in the Minneapolis Morning Tribune described him as a 33rd degree Freemason and the Knights Templar.
 Ezra Ames (1768–1836), American portrait painter
 Oliver Ames (4 February 1831 – 22 October 1895), 35th governor of Massachusetts. Primary lodge membership unknown, but made honorary member of Columbian Lodge of Boston.
 William Amherst, 3rd Earl Amherst (1836–1910), British nobleman and politician
 Roald Amundsen (1872–1928), Norwegian polar explorer and discoverer of South Pole
 Abdul Rahman Andak (1859–1930), Malaysian politician
 Clinton Presba Anderson (23 October 1895 – 11 November 1975), congressman from New Mexico, the U.S. Secretary of Agriculture, and a U.S. senator from New Mexico. Raised in Albuquerque Lodge No. 60 in 1917.
 George T. Anderson (3 February 1824 – 4 April 1901), general in the Confederate States Army during the American Civil War
 Heartley "Hunk "Anderson (22 September 1898 – 24 April 1978), American football player and coach. Coached for Notre Dame and the Chicago Bears, among others. Calumet Lodge No. 271, Calumet, Michigan.
 Jack Z. Anderson (22 March 1904 – 9 February 1981), congressman from California. Raised in Texas Lodge No. 46, San Juan Bautista, California, in 1946.
 James Anderson (1679ca. 1679/1680–1739), Presbyterian minister best known for his influence on the early development of Freemasonry. Author of The Constitutions of the Free-Masons (1723) and The New Book of Constitutions of the Antient and Honourable Fraternity of Free and Accepted Masons (1738)
 Joseph Anderson (5 November 1757 – 17 April 1837), U.S. senator from Tennessee and first comptroller of the U.S. Treasury. Military Lodge No. 19 of Pennsylvania and Lodge No. 36 in the New Jersey Brigade during the American Revolution. After the war was a member of Princeton Lodge No. 38 of New Jersey.
 Robert Anderson (14 June 1805 – 26 October 1871), Union Army officer in the American Civil War, known for being the commander of Fort Sumter at the beginning of the war. Raised in Mercer Lodge No. 50, Trenton, New Jersey, in 1858. Honorary member of Pacific Lodge No. 233 of New York City.
 Robert B. Anderson (4 June 1910 – 14 August 1989), U.S. Secretary of the Navy and later Secretary of the Treasury during the Eisenhower Administration. Member of Vernon Lodge No. 655 Vernon, Texas, and was later an officer of the Grand Lodge of Texas.
 Robert H. Anderson (1 October 1835 – 8 February 1888), cavalry and artillery officer in the Confederate States Army during the American Civil War. Attained the rank of brigadier general. Commander of Palestine Commandery, Knights Templar No. 7 at Savannah, Georgia, in the 1880s.
 Rudolph Martin Anderson (30 June 1876 – 21 June 1961), Canadian zoologist and explorer
 Sigurd Anderson (22 January 1904 – 21 December 1990), 19th governor of South Dakota. Raised in Coteau Lodge No. 54 at Webster, South Dakota, in 1943.
 Victor Emanuel Anderson (30 March 1902 – 15 August 1962), 28th governor of Nebraska. Raised in George Washington Lodge No. 250, Lincoln, Nebraska, in 1928.
 William F. Anderson (1860–1944), American Methodist pastor, writer, and educator who served as Bishop of Chattanooga, Cincinnati, and Boston, and as acting president of Boston University from 1 January 1925 to 15 May 1926.
 William Hamilton Anderson (1874–c. 1959), American prohibitionist
 Charles Anderson-Pelham (1749–1823), British politician, Member of Parliament (1768–1794)
 Edward Andrade (1887–1971), English physicist. Initiated into Lodge Progresso No. 4 in 1935.
 Ignacio Andrade (31 July 1839 – 17 February 1925), President of Venezuela from 1898 to 1899
 Gyula Andrássy (1823 – 1890), Hungarian statesman,  Prime Minister of Hungary (1867–1871) and subsequently as Foreign Minister of Austria-Hungary (1871–1879).
 Johannes Valentinus Andreae (17 August 1586 – 27 June 1654), Protestant theologian, alchemist, satirical writer and early Rosicrucian. Believed to have been a Mason.
 Louis André (1838–1913), French soldier, Minister of War from 1900 until 1904
 Charles O. Andrews (7 March 1877 – 18 September 1946), U.S. senator from Florida, 1936 until 1946. Orlando Lodge No. 69.
 Frank Andrews (15 June 1864 – 7 December 1936), first Assistant Attorney General of Texas
 Robert Andrews (c. 1750–1804), chaplain of the 2nd Virginia Regiment in the Continental Army during the American Revolution. Early Grand Master of Virginia. Member of Williamsburg Lodge No. 6.
 Ivo Andrić (1892–1975), Yugoslav writer and Nobel Prize laureate
 Frank M. Angellotti (4 September 1861 – 23 May 1932), Chief Justice of California from 1915 to 1921. Raised in Marin Lodge No. 191, San Rafael, California, in 1886. Grand Master of California 1888–1889.
 Levi Ankeny (1 August 1844 – 29 March 1921), U.S. senator from the state of Washington. Became a member of Willamette Lodge No. 2 of Portland, Oregon, in 1866, affiliating with Walla Walla Lodge No. 7 in 1878, serving as master in 1881.
 Arthur Annesley, 1st Earl of Mountnorris (7 August 1744 – 4 July 1816), Irish peer
 George Annesley, 2nd Earl of Mountnorris (4 December 1770 – 23 July 1844), Irish peer
 Martin Frederick Ansel (12 December 1850 – 23 August 1945), 89th governor of South Carolina
 Martin C. Ansorge (1 January 1882 – 4 February 1967), congressman from New York. Mt. Nebo Lodge No. 257, New York City.
 Jules Anspach (1829–1879), Belgian politician
 William Anstruther-Gray, Baron Kilmany (5 March 1905 – 6 August 1985), British politician. Member of the Apollo University Lodge. 
 Galicano Apacible (1864–1949), Filipino politician
 Apathy (1979-), stage name of underground rapper, born Chad Bromley. Wooster Lodge No. 10, Colchester, Connecticut.
 Raymond Apple (1935–), Chief Rabbi, Great Synagogue (Sydney), Australia (1972–2005)
 T. Frank Appleby (10 October 1864 – 15 December 1924), congressman from New Jersey
 Sir Edward Victor Appleton (1892–1965), British physicist. Nobel Prize 1947. Isaac Newton University Lodge No. 859, Cambridge.
 W. A. Appleton, British trade unionist and politician
 Matthew Arbuckle (1778–1851), career soldier in the U.S. Army closely identified with the Indian Territory
 John Arbuthnot (1667–1735), British physician and satirist
 Branch T. Archer (1790–1856), Texan Commissioner to the United States, Speaker of the House of the Republic of Texas House of Representatives, and Secretary of War of the Republic of Texas. Raised in Harmony Lodge No. 62 at Pridewell, Virginia.
 Dennis Archer (1942–), U.S. politician. Geometry Lodge #49 (Prince Hall), Detroit.
 Germán Arciniegas (1900–1999), Colombian historian and public intellectual 
 Leslie C. Arends (27 September 1895 – 17 July 1985), congressman from Illinois
 Constantin Argetoianu (1871–1955), Prime Minister of Romania
 Richard Arlen (1 September 1899 – 28 March 1976), American actor of film and television. Member Utopia Lodge No. 537, Los Angeles.
 Lewis Armistead (1817–1863), Confederate general during the American Civil War. Alexandria-Washington Lodge #22, Alexandria, Virginia.
 David H. Armstrong (21 October 1812 – 18 March 1893), U.S. senator from Missouri. Member of Washington Lodge No. 9 of St. Louis.
 Henry W. Armstrong (22 July 1879 – 28 February 1951), American boxer, booking agent, producer, singer, pianist and Tin Pan Alley composer. Composed the song "Sweet Adeline". Raised in 1922 in Montgomery Lodge No. 68, New York City.
 John Armstrong Jr. (1758–1843), American soldier, delegate to the Continental Congress, U.S. senator and Secretary of War. Hibernia Lodge No. 339, New York.
 Sir Richard Armstrong (c. 1782–3 March 1854), British Army officer. Commander of the British forces in Canada West from 1842 to 1848.
 Edward F. Arn (19 May 1906 – 22 January 1998), 32nd governor of Kansas. Raised in Wyandotte Lodge No. 3, Kansas City, Kansas, in 1927. Member of the International Supreme Council of the Order of DeMolay. Deputy to imperial potentate of the Shrine in 1954–55.
 Ellis Arnall (20 March 1907 – 13 December 1992), 69th governor of the U.S. state of Georgia from 1943 to 1947. Member of Cowetta Lodge No. 60 at Newnan, Georgia.
 Thomas Arne (1710–1778), British composer of "Rule Britannia"
 Benedict Arnold (1741–1801), American general and traitor. Hiram Lodge No. 1, New Haven, Connecticut.
 Eddy Arnold (1918–2008), American country music singer. East Nashville Lodge 560 F& A.M., East Nashville, Tennessee.
 Henry H. Arnold (1886–1950), American general, only person to hold five-star rank in two branches of service. Union Lodge No. 7, KS.
 Samuel W. (Wat) Arnold (21 September 1879 – 18 December 1961), congressman from Missouri. Member of Adair Lodge No. 366, Kirksville, Missouri.
 William W. Arnold (14 October 1877 – 23 November 1957), congressman from Illinois
 J. Hugo Aronson (1 September 1891 – 25 February 1978), 14th governor of the U.S. state of Montana. Received degrees in Shelby Lodge No. 143 in 1924 and later demitted to Cut Bank Lodge No. 82 in Cut Bank, both in Montana. King Gustav VI Adolf q.v. of Sweden appointed him as representative of the G.L. of Sweden to the G.L. of Montana.
 François-Marie Arouet, See Voltaire
 Emin Arslan (1868–1943), Lebanese journalist and diplomat
 Harold J. Arthur (1904–1971), 68th governor of Vermont from 1950 to 1951
 Jacob Arvey (3 November 1895 – 25 August 1977), influential Chicago political leader from the Depression era until the mid-1950s
 Gheorghe Asachi (1788–1869), Romanian writer, poet, painter, historian, dramatist and translator
 Frank G. Ashbrook (20 October 1892 – 15 September 1966), American mammalogist
 William A. Ashbrook (1 July 1867 – 1 January 1940), congressman from Ohio
 Turner Ashby (23 October 1828 – 6 June 1862), Confederate cavalry commander in the American Civil War. He had achieved prominence as Thomas J. "Stonewall" Jackson's cavalry commander. Member of Equality Lodge No. 44, Martinsburg, West Virginia.
 Bowman Foster Ashe (3 April 1885 – 16 December 1952), U.S. educator who served as the first president of the University of Miami
 James Mitchell Ashley (14 November 1824 – 16 September 1896), U.S. congressman, territorial governor of Montana and railroad president. Raised in 1853 in Toledo Lodge No. 144, Toledo, Ohio.
 Anthony Ashley-Cooper, 7th Earl of Shaftesbury (28 April 1801 – 1 October 1885), English philanthropist and social reformer. Member of the Apollo University Lodge. 
 Elias Ashmole (1617–1692), English antiquary and politician, Warrington Lodge, Lancashire
 Wayne N. Aspinall (3 April 1896 – 9 October 1983), congressman from Colorado. Raised in Palisade Lodge No. 125, Palisade, Colorado, in 1926.
 John Jacob Astor (1763–1848), American financier. Holland Lodge No. 8, New York, 1790.
 David Rice Atchison (11 August 1807 – 26 January 1886), U.S. senator from Missouri. Known for the claim that for one day (4 March 1849) he may have been Acting President of the United States. Member of Platte Lodge No. 56, Platte City, Missouri.
 John Murray, 3rd Duke of Atholl (6 May 1729 – 5 November 1774), Scottish peer and Tory politician. Succeeded his father as Grand Master of Grand Lodge of England in 1775, serving until 1781 and again from 1791 to 1813. Was Grand Master of Grand Lodge of Scotland from 1778 to 1779.
 John Murray, 4th Duke of Atholl, Scottish politician. Grand Master of Scotland (1778–1780).
 George Murray, 6th Duke of Atholl (20 September 1814 – 16 January 1864), Scottish peer. Served as 66th Grand Master Mason of Scotland 1843–1863. Grand Master of England from 1843 until his death in January 1864.
 John Stewart-Murray, 8th Duke of Atholl (15 December 1871 – 16 March 1942), Scottish soldier and Conservative politician. Served as 79th Grand Master Mason of Scotland 1909–1913.
 Smith D. Atkins (9 June 1836 – 27 March 1913), American newspaper editor, lawyer, and a Union Army colonel during the American Civil War
 Arthur K. Atkinson (19 October 1891–?), president of the Wabash Railroad in the mid-20th century. Member of University City Lodge No. 649, Missouri.
 George W. Atkinson (29 June 1845 – 4 April 1925), tenth governor of West Virginia. Raised in Kanawha Lodge No. 20, Charleston, West Virginia, 12 October 1866. Grand master of West Virginia in 1876 and Grand Secretary of the Grand Lodge of West Virginia from 1897 to 1901.
 William Yates Atkinson (11 November 1854 – 8 August 1899), 55th governor of Georgia
 William Wallace Atterbury (31 January 1866 – 20 September 1935), tenth president of the Pennsylvania Railroad. American brigadier general during World War I and built the American Army railroads in France during the war. Raised in Colonial Lodge No. 631, Philadelphia, in 1895.
 John James Audubon (1785–1851), American ornithologist and artist
 Arnold Jacob "Red" Auerbach (20 September 1917 – 28 October 2006), American basketball coach
 John Auldjo (1805–1886), British explorer, alpinist, engraver and author
 Henry Aurand (16 November 1894 – 1980), career U.S. Army officer who served in World War I, World War II and the Korean War. Member of Shamokin Lodge No. 255, Shamokin, Pennsylvania.
 Moses Austin (4 October 1761 – 10 June 1821), secured a grant of 200,000 acres in the province of Texas (under New Spain) on 17 January 1821, but died on his return trip to home in Missouri. His son Stephen F. Austin carried out the colonization of Texas.
 Stephen F. Austin (1793–1836), Secretary of State for the Republic of Texas. Louisiana Lodge No. 109, Missouri.
 Warren Austin (12 November 1877 – 25 December 1962), American politician and statesman; among other roles, he served as senator from Vermont and U.S. Ambassador to the United Nations. Raised in Brattleboro Lodge No. 102 at Burlington, Vermont.
 Gene Autry (1907–1998), movie and television star. Catoosa Lodge No. 185, Oklahoma.
 William H. Avery (11 August 1911 – 4 November 2009), 37th governor of Kansas. Received degrees in Wakefield Lodge No. 396, Wakefield, Kansas.
 Samuel Beach Axtell (14 October 1819 – 7 August 1891), notable for being the most controversial Chief Justice of the New Mexico Territorial Supreme Court; corrupted administration as governor of New Mexico; brief tenure as governor of Utah; and two-term congressman from California. Member of Amador Lodge No. 65, Jackson, California.
 Charles Brantley Aycock (11 November 1859 – 4 April 1912), 50th governor of North Carolina. He served as grand orator of the Grand Lodge of North Carolina in 1897.
 William Augustus Ayres (19 April 1867 – 17 February 1952), member of the U.S. House of Representatives from Kansas
 Allen Bristol Aylesworth (1854–1952), Canadian politician. Member of Ionic Lodge No. 25 in Toronto.
 William Edmondstoune Aytoun (21 June 1813 – 4 August 1865), Scottish lawyer and poet. Active member of the Scottish Grand Lodge and representative there of the Grand Lodge Royal York of Germany.
 Miguel de Azcuénaga (4 June 1754 – 19 December 1833), Argentine patriot
Abdul Qadir Al Jaza'iri, Sufi mystic, scholar and political leader. Brought Freemasonry into Grand Syria. Took oath on 18 June 1867, at a specially convened meeting of the Lodge of the Pyramids, Alexandria, Egypt. He is considered one of the most famous Arab Muslim freemasons.

B
 Amadou Hampâté Bâ (January or February 1901 – 15 May 1991), Malian writer and ethnologist
 Frederick H. Babbitt (1859–1931), American politician, president Vermont State Senate 1912–13
 Johann Christian Bach (1735–1782), European composer. Lodge of Nine Muses No. 235, London.
 Nahum J. Bachelder (3 September 1854 – 22 April 1934), 49th governor of New Hampshire
 Irving Bacheller (26 September 1859 – 24 February 1950), American journalist and writer. Raised 5 December 1899 in Kane Lodge No. 454, New York.
 Augustus Octavius Bacon (20 October 1839 – 14 February 1914), U.S. senator from Georgia
 Robert L. Bacon (23 July 1884 – 12 September 1938), American banker, lieutenant colonel, and congressman from New York
 Walter W. Bacon (20 January 1880 – 18 March 1962), 60th governor of Delaware. Member of St. John's Lodge No. 2, New Castle, Delaware, being raised 2 July 1902. Grand Master of the Grand Lodge of Delaware in 1915.
 Robert Baddeley (1733–1794), English actor of the Drury Lane Theatre in London. Member of St. Alban's Lodge No. 29, London.
 Michael Baden-Powell (born 11 December 1940), grandson of Robert Baden-Powell, the founder of the Scout Movement. State Commissioner for Special Duties, Scouts Australia, Victoria Branch. Lodge Baden-Powell No 488, Victoria, Australia.
 Arthur P. Bagby (1794 – 21 September 1858), tenth governor of Alabama. Served as grand orator of the Grand Lodge of Alabama.
 John J. Bagley (24 July 1832 – 27 July 1881), 16th governor of Michigan. Member of Charity Lodge No. 94, Detroit, Michigan.
 Karl Friedrich Bahrdt (25 August 1741 – 23 April 1792), German theologian and adventurer. Freemason, who with other Freemasons founded the "German Union" or the "Two and Twenty" society at Halle.
 Michael Baigent (1948–2013), British author and former editor of Freemasonry Today. Lodge of Economy No 76, Winchester.
 Carl Edward Bailey (8 October 1894 – 23 October 1948), 31st governor of Arkansas. Received 32° at Little Rock, 25 May 1928.
 James E. Bailey (15 August 1822 – 29 December 1885), U.S. senator from Tennessee. Member of Clarksville Lodge No. 89, Clarksville, Tennessee.
 John O. Bailey (26 September 1880 – 16 February 1959), American judge and politician in the state of Oregon. He was 27th Chief Justice of the Oregon Supreme Court. Raised in Doric Lodge No. 132, Portland, Oregon, about 1920.
 Joseph Bailey, 1st Baron Glanusk, Welsh politician and member of the Apollo University Lodge 
 Leonard C. Bailey, African American businessman and inventor
 Nat Bailey (31 January 1902 – 27 March 1978), American-born Canadian restaurateur, founder of White Spot. Mount Lebanon Lodge No. 72, Vancouver.
 Theodorus Bailey (12 April 1805 – 14 February 1877), United States Navy officer during the American Civil War. Raised in Washington Lodge No. 21, New York City, on 3 March 1829.
 Thomas L. Bailey (6 January 1888 – 2 November 1946), 48th governor of Mississippi
 Edward Hodges Baily (18 March 1788 – 22 May 1867), English sculptor
 John Baird, 1st Viscount Stonehaven (1874–1941), British politician, Member of Parliament (1910–1925), Governor-General of Australia (1925–1931). Grand Master of New South Wales (1928–1930).
 Bryant Baker (8 July 1881 – 29 March 1970), British-born American sculptor. Sculpted the 17 foot bronze of George Washington at the Washington Masonic National Memorial in Alexandria, Virginia. Member of Constitutional Lodge No. 294 at Beverley, Yorkshire, England.
 Howard Baker Sr. (12 January 1902 – 7 January 1964), congressman from Tennessee
 James Marion Baker (18 August 1861 – 1940), American political figure; held the position of Secretary of the U.S. Senate from 1913 to 1919
 Jonathan Baker, British Anglican Bishop of Fulham, initiated into the Apollo University Lodge 
 Nathaniel B. Baker (29 September 1818 – 11 September 1876), 24th governor of New Hampshire. A member of Western Star Lodge No. 100, Clinton, Iowa.
 Phil Baker (26 August 1896 – 30 November 1963), American comedian and emcee on radio. Also a vaudeville actor, composer, songwriter, accordionist and author. Raised in Keystone Lodge No. 235, New York City.
 Samuel Aaron Baker (7 November 1874 – 16 September 1933), 36th governor of Missouri. Member of Jefferson Lodge No. 43, Jefferson City, Missouri.
 Simmons Jones Baker (1775–1853), U.S. physician, planter, and legislator. Grand Master of Masons of North Carolina in 1832 and again in 1840. Laid the cornerstone of the state capitol building in Raleigh, North Carolina, on 4 July 1833.
 Simon Strousse Baker (11 July 1866 – 10 October 1932), sixth president of Washington & Jefferson College
 Walter Ransom Gail Baker (30 November 1892 – 30 October 1960), American electrical engineer. Founded the National Television System Committee, or NTSC, in 1940.
 Mikhail Bakunin (1814–1876), Russian revolutionary. Lodge Il Progresso Sociale, Florence, 1864
 Antonio González de Balcarce (24 June 1774 – 15 August 1819), Argentine military commander in the early 19th century
 Nicolae Bălcescu (1819–1852), Romanian historian, journalist and 1848 revolutionary
 Bernt Balchen (23 October 1899 – 17 October 1973), pioneer polar aviator, navigator, aircraft mechanical engineer and military leader. Member of Norseman Lodge No. 878 of Brooklyn, New York. With Admiral Byrd they dropped Masonic flags over the two poles, and dropped his Kismet Temple Shrine fez over the South Pole.
 H. C. Baldridge (24 November 1868 – 8 June 1947), 14th governor of Idaho. Raised in Parma Lodge No. 49, Parma, Idaho, in 1923.
 Henry Baldwin (1780–1844), Associate Justice of the Supreme Court of the United States. Master of Lodge No. 45 in Pittsburgh in 1805.
 Mark Baldwin (29 October 1863 – 10 November 1929), pitcher in Major League Baseball.
 Harold Ballard (1903–1990), National Hockey League team owner (Toronto Maple Leafs). Corinthian No. 481, GRC, Toronto.
 Hosea Ballou (30 April 1771 – 7 June 1852), American Universalist clergyman and theological writer. Member of Warren Lodge No. 23 at Woodstock, Vermont, and served as master in 1807.
 Robert C. Baltzell (15 August 1879 – 18 October 1950), U.S. federal judge
 Charles-Louis Balzac (1752–1820), French architect and sometime poet. Founded the Lodge of the Great Sphinx at Paris.
 Fred B. Balzar (15 June 1880 – 21 March 1934), 15th governor of Nevada. Raised 28 August 1908 in Inyo Lodge No. 221 at Independence, California, and later affiliated with Carson Lodge No. 1, Carson City, Nevada.
 Simon Bamberger (27 February 1846 – 6 October 1926), fourth governor of Utah
 Roger Bambuck (b. 25 November 1945), French Olympic sprinter and politician
 Augustus Bampfylde, 2nd Baron Poltimore (12 April 1837 – 3 May 1908), British politician, member of the Apollo University Lodge 
 Harry Hill Bandholtz (1864 – 11 May 1925), U.S. Army major general during World War I. Known for preventing Romanian soldiers from removing Transylvanian treasures from the National Museum of Hungary in Budapest during the Romanian occupation of the city in 1919.
 John H. Bankhead (13 September 1842 – 1 March 1920), U.S. senator from Alabama between 1907 and 1920. Confederate officer during the American Civil War. Grand master of Grand Lodge of Alabama in 1883–1884.
 Joseph Banks (1743–1820), English botanist. Inverness Lodge, No. 4367.
 Nathaniel P. Banks (30 January 1816 – 1 September 1894), 24th governor of Massachusetts, Speaker of the U.S. House of Representatives and Union general during the American Civil War. Member of Monitor Lodge, Waltham, Massachusetts.
 William V. Banks, founder of the first black-owned and black-operated television station in the United States
 Parke M. Banta (21 November 1891 – 12 May 1970), congressman from Missouri. Raised in Potosi Lodge No. 131 at Potosi, Missouri, about 1916, served as master in 1923.
 Leedham Bantock (18 May 1870 – 16 October 1928), actor, dramatist and early film director 
 Orion M. Barber (13 July 1857 – 28 March 1930), Vermont state politician and a judge of the U.S. Court of Customs and Patent Appeals
 Clarence Barbour (21 April 1867 – 16 January 1937), Baptist clergyman and educator most notable for having served as the president of Brown University. Served as Grand Chaplain of the Grand Lodges of both New York and Rhode Island.
 James Barbour (10 June 1775 – 7 June 1842), 18th governor of Virginia, a U.S. senator from 1814 to 1825, and the U.S. Secretary of War from 1825 to 1828. Member of Stephensburg Lodge No. 40, Stevensburg, Virginia.
 McClelland Barclay (1891–1942), American painter of pin-up art and war propaganda posters
 Malcolm Barclay-Harvey (1890–1969), British politician and colonial administrator, Member of Parliament (1923–1929, 1931–1939). Grand Master of Scotland (1949–1953).
 Guy K. Bard (24 October 1895 – 23 November 1953), Pennsylvania educator; later became a judge of the U.S. District Court for the Eastern District of Pennsylvania
 Samuel Bard (1 April 1742 – 24 May 1821), American physician who founded the first medical school in New York. Personal physician to George Washington. Member of Union Lodge, New York.
 Thomas R. Bard (8 December 1841 – 5 March 1915), U.S. senator from California. Member of Hueneme Lodge No. 311, California.
 Graham Arthur Barden (25 September 1896 – 29 January 1967), congressman from North Carolina
 Clinton L. Bardo (1868–1937), American industrialist whose career included stints as general manager of the New York, New Haven and Hartford Railroad and president of the New York Shipbuilding Corporation.
 Evelyn Baring, 1st Baron Howick of Glendale (29 September 1903 – 10 March 1973), British colonial administrator and member of the Apollo University Lodge 
 John Baring, 7th Baron Ashburton (2 November 1928 – 6 October 2020), British merchant banker and member of the Apollo University Lodge 
 Walter S. Baring Jr. (9 September 1911 – 13 July 1975), congressman from Nevada. Raised in May 1941, Reno Lodge No. 13.
 William J. Barker (25 June 1886 – 13 April 1968), U.S. federal judge
 Elmer E. Barlow (18 May 1887 – 26 June 1948), American jurist from Wisconsin
 Joel Barlow (24 March 1754 – 26 December 1812), American poet, diplomat, and politician. Member of St. Johns Lodge No 4., Hartford, Connecticut.
 Francis Stillman Barnard (1856–1936), Canadian politician and Lieutenant Governor of British Columbia. Raised: Victoria Columbia No. 1. 17 April 1887.
 Isaac D. Barnard (18 July 1791 – 28 February 1834), U.S. senator from Pennsylvania
 Thomas John Barnardo (1845–1905), British philanthropist
 Cassius McDonald Barnes, American Civil War soldier, lawyer and politician who served as the fourth governor of Oklahoma Territory. Master of Guthrie Lodge No. 35, Guthrie, Oklahoma, in 1902.
 Henry Barnes, 2nd Baron Gorell (21 January 1882 – 16 January 1917), British soldier and member of the Apollo University Lodge 
 James M. Barnes (9 January 1899 – 8 June 1958), congressman from Illinois. Member of Jacksonville Lodge No. 570, Jacksonville, Illinois.
 Will C. Barnes (21 June 1858 – 17 December 1936), American author, rancher, and state legislator in Arizona and New Mexico. Received the Medal of Honor for bravery at the Battle of Fort Apache.
 Joshua Barney (6 July 1759 – 1 December 1818), American naval officer. Served in the Continental Navy during the Revolutionary War and would later achieve the rank of commodore in the U.S. Navy. Also served in the War of 1812. He was made a Freemason in the Lodge of the Nine Sisters, Paris, France, in 1799 (although other sources state that he was raised in Lodge No. 3, Philadelphia, Pa. on 17 May 1777, and still another lists him as a member of No. 3 on 1 May 1777). He was a visitor of Lodge No. 2, Philadelphia on 16 June 1780.
 Maurice Victor Barnhill (1887–1963), Associate Justice (1937–1954) and Chief Justice (1954–1956) of the North Carolina Supreme Court
 Simion Bărnuţiu (1808–1864), Romanian philosopher and politician
 Henry A. Barnum (24 September 1833 – 29 January 1892), Union Army officer during the American Civil War and a recipient of the Medal of Honor. Member of Syracuse Lodge No. 102, Syracuse, New York.
 William Henry Barnum (17 September 1818 – 30 April 1889), U.S. senator from Connecticut. Member of Montgomery Lodge No. 13 at Lakeville, Connecticut.
 Diego Martínez Barrio (1883–1962), Prime Minister of Spain and founder of the Republican Union
 Samuel Barrett (1879–1965), American anthropologist and linguist who studied Native American peoples
 Lewis O. Barrows (7 June 1893 – 30 January 1967), 57th governor of Maine
 John Barry (25 March 1745 – 13 September 1803), officer in the Continental Navy during the American Revolutionary War and later in the U.S. Navy. Initiated in Lodge No. 2, Philadelphia, on 12 October 1795. Suspended for non-payment of dues in 1800.
 William T. Barry (5 February 1784 – 30 August 1835), U.S. Postmaster General during the Jackson Administration. U.S. senator from Kentucky. Member of Lexington Lodge No. 1 and later of Davies Lodge No. 22 of Lexington. Was elected an honorary member of Federal Lodge No. 1, Washington, D.C., on 4 January 1830.
 John L. Barstow (21 February 1832 – 28 June 1913), 39th governor of Vermont
 Bobby Barth (born 5 December 1952),  American singer, songwriter, record producer and guitarist. Member of Denver Lodge No. 5.
 Frédéric Auguste Bartholdi (1834–1904), sculptor of New York's Statue of Liberty. Lodge Alsace-Lorraine, Paris.
 Harold Roe Bartle (25 June 1901 – 9 May 1974), American businessman, philanthropist, Boy Scout executive, and professional public speaker. Served two terms as mayor of Kansas City, Missouri. Member of Lebanon Lodge No. 87 in Kentucky plus the Ararat Shriners of Kansas City, Missouri.
 John H. Bartlett (15 March 1869 – 19 March 1952), 57th governor of New Hampshire
 Josiah Bartlett (21 November 1729 – 19 May 1795), American physician and statesman, delegate to the Continental Congress for New Hampshire and signatory of the Declaration of Independence. He was later Chief Justice of the New Hampshire Superior Court of Judicature and governor of the state. Although his lodge is not known, his great-grandson, Levi S. Bartlett, had a letter written by Josiah to his son Ezra saying, "I attended a Mason meeting last night, and as soon as you can I wish you would join the Masons."
 Robert Bartlett (15 August 1875 – 28 April 1946), Canadian navigator and Arctic explorer of the late 19th and early 20th centuries
 Francesco Bartolozzi (25 September 1725 – 7 March 1815), Italian engraver. Was an early member of the Lodge of Nine Muses No. 235, London. The frontispiece of the 1784 edition of the Book of Constitutions is his engraving.
 Edmund Barton (1849–1920), first prime minister of the Commonwealth of Australia, Speaker of the legislative assembly. Initiated: Australian Lodge of Harmony No. 556 English Constitution in Sydney on 13 March 1878.
 William Barton (1748–1831), officer in the Continental Army during the American War of Independence who retired with the rank of colonel. Became a member of St. John's Lodge, Providence, Rhode Island, in 1779.
 William "Count" Basie (1904–1984), jazz orchestra leader and composer. Wisdom Lodge No. 102 (Prince Hall), Chicago.
 Charles Baskerville (1870–1922), American chemist
 Edward Bass (23 November 1726 – 10 September 1803), first American Episcopal bishop of the Diocese of Massachusetts and second bishop of the Diocese of Rhode Island. Admitted as a member of St. John's Lodge No. 1 of Portsmouth, New Hampshire, on 12 April 1758. Served as grand chaplain of the Grand Lodge of Massachusetts in 1768.
 Perkins Bass (6 October 1912 – 25 October 2011), four-term congressman from New Hampshire. Member of Altemont Lodge No. 26, Peterborough, New Hampshire.
 Francis Basset, 1st Baron de Dunstanville (9 August 1757 – 14 February 1835), English politician
 Richard Napoleon Batchelder (27 July 1832 – 4 January 1901), 18th Quartermaster General of the United States Army. Awarded the Medal of Honor in 1891. Member of Lafayette Lodge No. 41 at Manchester, New Hampshire.
 William B. Bate (7 October 1826 – 9 March 1905), American soldier and politician. Governor of Tennessee from 1883 to 1887, and U.S. senator from 1887 until his death. Major general in the Confederate Army during the American Civil War. Member of King Solomon Lodge No. 94, Gallatin, Tennessee.
 Edward Bates (4 September 1793 – 25 March 1869), American lawyer and statesman. First Attorney General of Missouri after it was admitted as a state. U.S. Attorney General under Lincoln from 1861 to 1864. Was a member of Missouri Lodge No. 12, under Tennessee charter (later Missouri No. 1). Was active in the formation of the Grand Lodge of Missouri. Served four terms as grand master, 1825-26-27-31.
 Frederick Bates (1777–1825), governor of Missouri
 Isaac C. Bates (23 January 1779 – 16 March 1845), American politician from Massachusetts serving in both houses of the U.S. Congress. Member of Jerusalem Lodge, Northampton, Massachusetts.
 John L. Bates (18 September 1859 – 8 June 1946), 41st governor of Massachusetts. Member, Baalbec Lodge, Boston.
 Joe B. Bates (29 October 1893 – 10 September 1965), congressman from Kentucky
 Thomas Bates), British surgeon
 Thomas Bath (1875–1956), Australian politician, former Western Australian Leader of the Opposition. Involved in founding of Lodge Bonnie Doon, 839, S.C.
 Charles Bathurst (1867–1958), Governor-General of New Zealand, Grand Master of the Grand Lodge of New Zealand, initiated in Apollo University Lodge 
 William Battine (25 January 1765 – 5 September 1836), English poet
 John S. Battle (11 July 1890 – 9 April 1972), 56th governor of Virginia. Member of Charlottesville Lodge No. 5, Charlottesville, Virginia.
 Laurie C. Battle (10 May 1912 – 2 May 2000), congressman from Alabama. Member of Docena Lodge No. 815, Docena, Alabama, as well as the Zamora Shriners and Order of the Eastern Star Chapter 118 in Birmingham.
 Warner Baxter (29 March 1889 – 7 May 1951), American film actor of the silent and early talkie period. Second person to win the Academy Award for Best Actor. Member Cahuenga Lodge No. 513, Hollywood, California.
 Birch Bayh (1928–2019), U.S. senator from Indiana from 1962 to 1981
 Francis Baylies (16 October 1783 – 28 October 1852), congressman from Massachusetts. Original lodge not known, but made honorary member of Mount Lebanon Lodge, Boston, on 26 January 1835.
 William Wither Bramston Beach (25 December 1826 – 3 August 1901), British politician and railway entrepreneur. Apollo University Lodge No 357, Oxford, and multiple other lodges. Third Grand Principal, Supreme Grand Chapter of England (Royal Arch).
 Sir Michael Hicks Beach, 8th Baronet (25 October 1809 – 22 November 1854), British politician, initiated in the Apollo University Lodge 
 Michael Hicks Beach, 1st Earl St Aldwyn (23 October 1837 – 30 April 1916), British politician and Chancellor of the Exchequer, member of the Apollo University Lodge 
 Jeremy Beadle MBE (12 April 1948 – 30 January 2008), English television presenter, radio presenter, writer, and producer. Westminster City Council Lodge No 2882 (London).
 George Lafayette Beal (21 May 1825 – 11 December 1896), American politician from Maine who served in the federal forces during the American Civil War. Member of Oxford Lodge No. 18, Norway, Maine.
 John Beale (1608–1683), English gardener and writer
 John V. Beamer (17 November 1896 – 8 September 1964), congressman from Indiana. Member of Hanna Lodge No. 61, Wabash, Indiana.
 Henry J. Bean (13 November 1853 – 8 May 1941), American politician and judge in Oregon. 24th Chief Justice of the Oregon Supreme Court.
 Daniel Carter Beard (1850–1941), founder of the Boy Scouts. Initiated in Mariner's Lodge No. 67, New York City, and later affiliated with Cornucopia Lodge 563, Flushing, New York.
 William S. Beardsley (13 May 1901 – 21 November 1954), 31st governor of Iowa
 John Beatty (10 December 1749 – 30 May 1826), American physician and statesman. An officer of the Continental Army, he was appointed Commissary General for Prisoners with the rank of colonel. Was a member of the Continental Congress in 1784 and 1785. Was a member of the U.S. House of Representatives from New Jersey during the Third Congress. Raised in Trenton Lodge No. 5, Trenton, New Jersey. A past master of that lodge, he was elected Grand Master of the Grand Lodge of New Jersey in 1791. In 1792 he transferred his membership to Solomon's Lodge No. 1.
 Charles Beauclerk, 1st Duke of St Albans (8 May 1670 – 10 May 1726), illegitimate son of King Charles II and Nell Gwynne
 Henry Somerset, 5th Duke of Beaufort (16 October 1744 – 11 October 1803), Grand Master of Grand Lodge of England, 1767–71
 Honoré Beaugrand (1848–1906), politician, journalist, Fall River Lodge 1873; assisted in founding Montreal Emancipation Lodge in 1897
 Eugène de Beauharnais (3 September 1781 – 21 February 1824), Viceroy of Italy under Napoleon
 Charles Geneviève Louis Auguste André Timothée d'Éon de Beaumont (1728–1810), French soldier, diplomat and spy. Raised: January, 1769, Lodge of Immortality No. 376, London.
 Campbell E. Beaumont (27 August 1883 – 19 November 1954), U.S. federal judge from Kentucky
 Jean-Baptiste-Jacques Élie de Beaumont, French lawyer
 Tim Beaumont (22 November 1928 – 8 April 2008), British politician 
 William Beaumont (21 November 1785 – 25 April 1853), surgeon in the U.S. Army who became known as the "Father of Gastric Physiology" following his research on human digestion. Raised in Harmony Lodge, Champlain, New York, 11 April 1820.
 P. G. T. Beauregard (28 May 1818 – 20 February 1893), American military officer, politician, inventor, writer, civil servant, and the first prominent general of the Confederate States Army during the American Civil War
 Charles Bebb (10 April 1856 – 21 June 1942), British-American architect who designed the Washington State Capitol building
 Stephen David Bechtel Sr. (24 September 1900 – 14 March 1989), founder of the Bechtel Corporation and the president of the company from 1933 through 1960. Raised 30 June 1923 in Oakland Lodge No. 188, Oakland, California.
 Theodric Romeyn Beck (11 April 1791 – 19 November 1855), American physician in New York specializing in medical jurisprudence who authored the first significant American book on forensic medicine, Elements of Medical Jurisprudence, in 1823. Member of Masters Lodge No. 5, Albany, New York.
 William Becket (1684–1738), English surgeon and antiquary
 Rudolph Zacharias Becker (9 April 1752 – 28 March 1822), German educator and author, and active Freemason of Gotha. Published an historical essay in 1786 on the Bavarian Illuminati titled Grundsätze, Verfassung und Schicksale des Illuminates Order in Baiern.
 J. C. W. Beckham (5 August 1869 – 9 January 1940), 35th governor of Kentucky. Member of Duvall Lodge No. 6, Bardstown, Kentucky.
 John J. Beckley (4 August 1757 – 8 April 1807), first Librarian of Congress as well as first and fourth Clerk of the U.S. House of Representatives. Member of Williamsburg Lodge No. 6, Williamsburg, Virginia.
 Johann Beckmann (1739–1811), German scientific author and coiner of the word "technology", to mean the science of trades. He was the first man to teach technology and write about it as an academic subject.
 Thomas Taylour, Earl of Bective, Grand Sovereign of the Red Cross of Constantine, 1886
 Gunning Bedford Jr. (1747–1812), signer of the U.S. Constitution; first Grand Master of Masons in Delaware
 William Kirkpatrick Riland Bedford, British clergyman and antiquary, member of Apollo University Lodge 
 Joseph D. Bedle (5 January 1821 – 21 October 1894), 23rd governor of New Jersey. Raised in Olive Branch Lodge No. 16, Freehold, New Jersey, on 24 April 1857.
 Hamilton P. Bee (22 July 1822 – 3 October 1897), American politician in early Texas who served one term as Speaker of the Texas House of Representatives and later was a Confederate States Army general during the American Civil War. Member of Austin Lodge No. 12, Texas.
 Robert Livingston Beeckman (15 April 1866 – 21 January 1935), 52nd governor of Rhode Island
 Carroll L. Beedy (1880–1947), congressman from Maine from 1921 to 1935
 Wallace Beery (1 April 1885 – 15 April 1949), American actor. Won the Academy Award for Best Actor for the 1931 film The Champ. Member of Blaney Lodge No. 271 of Chicago, Illinois.
 Ludwig van Beethoven (1770–1827), composer. Though no records exist, several of Beethoven's biographers state that he was a Freemason based on other evidence.
 Lyall T. Beggs (9 November 1899 – 14 May 1973), Wisconsin lawyer and politician. Past commander in chief of the Veterans of Foreign Wars and a member of the Wisconsin State Assembly.
 Josiah Begole (20 January 1815 – 5 June 1896), congressman and the 19th governor of Michigan. Member of Flint Lodge No. 23, Flint, Michigan.
 Robert S. Beightler (21 March 1892 – 12 February 1978), U.S. Army major general and Ohio political insider
 Jonathan Belcher (8 January 1681/2[1] – 31 August 1757), merchant, businessman, and politician from the Province of Massachusetts Bay during the American colonial period. Served simultaneously for over a decade as colonial governor of the British colonies of New Hampshire (1729–1741) and Massachusetts (1730–1741) and later for ten years as governor of New Jersey (1747–1757). Raised in an old "Guilde Lodge" in England in 1704–13 years before the founding of the G.L. of England. Reported as having been on the rolls of the craft in Nova Scotia at an early date. Was affiliated with St. John's Lodge in Boston.
 Manuel Belgrano (3 June 1770 – 20 June 1820), Argentine economist, lawyer, politician, and military leader. He took part in the Argentine War of Independence and created the flag of Argentina. He is regarded as one of the main Libertadores of the country.
 Elliott Belgrave (16 March 1931) , Governor-General of Barbados, Past District Grand Master of the District Grand Lodge of Barbados (Scottish Constitution)
 Irwin Belk (4 April 1922 – 24 February 2018), CEO of Belk, a national department store chain. Under his leadership, Belk Inc. became the largest, privately owned department store chain in the United States.  Belk served in the North Carolina House of Representatives from 1959 to 1962 and the North Carolina Senate from 1963 to 1966. In 1999, President Bill Clinton appointed Belk as an alternative delegate to the United Nations. Belk was a member and retired elder of Myers Park Presbyterian Church.   He was Raised to the Degree of Master Mason on (4 February 1944) at Phalanx Lodge No. 31 Charlotte, North Carolina.
 John Montgomery Belk (29 March 1920 – 17 August 2007), head of the Belk department store chain and mayor of Charlotte, North Carolina, for four terms (1969–1977). Petitioned (21 January 1946), Initiated (4 March 1946), Passed (15 April 1946) and Raised (12 August 1946) all in Excelsior Lodge No. 261 of Charlotte.
 Andrew Bell (1726–1809), Scottish printer, founder of the Encyclopædia Britannica
 Charles J. Bell (1858–1929), Scotch-Irish American businessman. He was a cousin of Alexander Graham Bell and as such was an early executive of Bell Telephone. Co-founder of the National Geographic Society, and was its first treasurer.
 Charles S. Bell (1880–1965), lawyer and jurist from Cincinnati. Associate Justice of the Supreme Court of Ohio 1942–1947.
 Francis Bell (1851–1936), Prime Minister of New Zealand
 Frank Bell (28 January 1840 – 13 February 1927), sixth governor of Nevada. Member of Reno Lodge No. 13, and served as Grand Master of the Grand Lodge of Nevada.
 John Bell (New Hampshire) (20 July 1765 – 22 March 1836), governor of New Hampshire for one year (1828 to 1829). Member of St. John's Lodge No. 1, Portsmouth, New Hampshire.
 John Bell (Tennessee) (18 February 1796 – 10 September 1869), Tennessee politician. Served in the U.S. House of Representatives from 1827 to 1841, and in the U.S. Senate from 1847 to 1859. Speaker of the House for the 23rd Congress (1834–1835), and briefly served as Secretary of War during the administration of William Henry Harrison (1841). In 1860, he ran for president as the candidate for the Constitutional Union Party. Member of King Solomon Lodge No. 6 at Gallatin, Tennessee.
 Lawrence Dale Bell (5 April 1894 – 20 October 1956), founder of Bell Aircraft Corporation
 James Bellak (1813–1891), musician and instrument manufacturer
 Francis Bellamy (18 May 1855 – 28 August 1931), author of the U.S. Pledge of Allegiance. Member of Little Falls Lodge No. 181, Little Falls, New York.
 Johann Joachim Bellermann (23 September 1754 – 25 October 1842), German Hebraist and professor of theology at Berlin University
 Sir Henry Bellingham, 4th Baronet (23 August 1846 – 9 June 1921), Anglo-Irish politician. Member of Apollo University Lodge. 
 Harry H. Belt, American educator, lawyer, and judge in the state of Oregon. 28th Chief Justice of the Oregon Supreme Court.
 Giovanni Battista Belzoni (5 November 1778 – 3 December 1823), also known as The Great Belzoni, a prolific Italian explorer and pioneer archaeologist of Egyptian antiquities
 Charles Albert "Chief" Bender (5 May 1884 – 22 May 1954), Major League Baseball pitcher during the first two decades of the 20th century. Elected to the Baseball Hall of Fame in 1953. Petitioned Robert A. Lamberton Lodge No. 487 of Philadelphia when 27 years of age and was raised on 4 April 1911. He was suspended for non-payment of dues in 1938, but reinstated in 1943.
 Edvard Beneš (1884–1948), President of Czechoslovakia (1935–1939, 1945–1948). Ian Amos Komensky Lodge No. 1, Prague.
 Conrado Benitez (1889 – 4 January 1971), Philippine statesman. Helped write the Philippine constitution. Grand Master of the Philippines.
 Alexander von Benckendorff (4 July 1781 or 1783 – 5 October 1844), Russian cavalry general and statesman. Member of the Lodge of United Friends in St. Petersburg.
 Augustus W. Bennet (7 October 1897 – 5 June 1983), congressman from New York. Member of Hudson River Lodge No. 607, Newburgh, New York, serving as master in 1930.
 Henry Grey Bennet (2 December 1777 – 29 May 1836), English politician
 William Stiles Bennet (9 November 1870 – 1 December 1962), congressman from New York
 Caleb P. Bennett (11 November 1758 – 9 May 1836), American soldier and politician from Delaware. He was a veteran of the American Revolution and the War of 1812, and served as governor of Delaware. Raised in Lodge No. 14 at Christina Ferry, Delaware, on 16 January 1781.
 Charles Edward Bennett (2 December 1910 – 6 September 2003), congressman from Florida from 1949 to 1993. Member of Riverside Lodge No. 266, Jacksonville, Florida.
 Henry G. Bennett (14 December 1886 – 22 December 1951), prominent educational figure from Oklahoma. Served as the president of Southeastern Oklahoma State University and Oklahoma State University. He was appointed by Harry S. Truman as an Assistant Secretary of State.
 R. B. Bennett (1870–1947), Prime Minister of Canada 1930–1935
 Thomas Bennett Jr. (14 August 1781 – 30 January 1865), 48th governor of South Carolina. Member of Solomons Lodge No. 1, Charleston.
 Henry Arthur Benning (8 August 1879 – 14 April 1962), vice-president and general manager of the Amalgamated Sugar Company
 Camillo Benso, Count of Cavour (1810–1861), Italian politician
 Carville Benson (24 August 1872 – 8 February 1929), congressman from Maryland
 Elmer Austin Benson (22 September 1895 – 13 March 1985), 24th governor of Minnesota. Raised in Appleton Lodge No. 137, Appleton, Minnesota, on 3 January 1917.
 William Benswanger (22 February 1892 – 15 January 1972), president and chief executive of the Pittsburgh Pirates Major League Baseball franchise 1932 through 1946. Member of Lodge No. 45 of Pittsburgh.
 Charles Bent (11 November 1799 – 19 January 1847), first civilian governor of the New Mexico Territory in September 1846
 Alvin Morell Bentley (30 August 1918 – 10 April 1969), congressman from Michigan. One of the victims of the 1954 U.S. Capitol shootings. Member of Owosso Lodge No. 81, Owosso, Michigan.
 William Plummer Benton (25 December 1828 – 14 March 1867), American lawyer and soldier who served in both the Mexican–American War and the American Civil War. Member of Webb Lodge No. 24 at Richmond, Indiana.
 Lloyd Bentsen (1921–2006), U.S. senator from Texas, nominee (Democratic Party) for vice president in 1988
 Henry Beresford, 3rd Marquess of Waterford (26 April 1811 – 29 March 1859), Irish aristocrat and member of the Apollo University Lodge 
 Victor L. Berger (1860–1929), founding member of the Social Democratic Party of America. Congressman. Raised in Aurora Lodge No. 30, Milwaukee, on 26 February 1889.
 George Bergstrom (12 March 1876 – 1955), American architect of Norwegian heritage noted for his design work on the Pentagon
 Randolph C. Berkeley (9 January 1875 – 31 January 1960), U.S. Marine Corps major general who received the Medal of Honor for his actions during the U.S. occupation of Veracruz
 Irving Berlin (1888–1989), composer. Munn Lodge No. 190, New York.
 Silvio Berlusconi (1936–), Italian media tycoon and politician, Prime Minister of Italy. Initiated in Lodge Propaganda Due; expelled in 1981 (some say 1976) by the Grand Orient of Italy.
 Remigio Morales Bermúdez (30 September 1836 – 1 April 1894), President of Peru from 1890 to 1894
 Alain Bernheim (1931–2022), musician and Masonic researcher. Loge Les Amis Discrets n° 26, Grand Lodge Alpina of Switzerland.
 Ben Bernie (30 May 1891 – 23 October 1943), American jazz violinist and radio personality
 Arnaud Berquin (September 1747 – 21 December 1791), French children's author
 George L. Berry (12 September 1882 – 4 December 1948), U.S. senator from Tennessee from 1937 to 1938. One of the founders of the American Legion.
 Hiram Gregory Berry (27 August 1824 – 2 May 1863), American politician and general in the Army of the Potomac during the American Civil War. Member of Aurora Lodge No. 50, Rockland, Maine.
 Seymour Berry, 2nd Viscount Camrose (12 July 1909 – 15 February 1995), British newspaperman and member of the Apollo University Lodge 
 Ted Berry (1905–2000), American politician; first African American mayor of Cincinnati, Ohio
 Tom Berry (23 April 1879 – 30 October 1951), 14th governor of South Dakota
 Clifford K. Berryman (2 April 1869 – 11 December 1949), Pulitzer Prize-winning cartoonist with the Washington Star newspaper from 1907 to 1949. Also a cartoonist for The Washington Post from 1891 to 1907. Member of Temple Noyes Lodge No. 32 of Washington, D.C.
 Paul Bert (17 October 1833 – 11 November 1886), French zoologist, physiologist and politician
 Francisco Bertrand (1866–1926), twice president of Honduras
 Jöns Jacob Berzelius (20 August 1779 – 7 August 1848), Swedish chemist. Initiated in 1805 in St. John's Lodge St. Erik, at Stockholm.
 Walter Besant (14 August 1836 – 9 June 1901), novelist and historian. Raised in Mauritius Lodge in 1862 and became master of Marquis of Dalhousie Lodge No. 1159, London, in 1873. Conceived the idea of establishing a lodge of research and as a result became one of the founders of the famous Quatuor Coronati Lodge No. 2076 of London, serving as its treasurer at one time.
 William Thomas Best (13 August 1826 – 10 May 1897), English organist
 Ramón Emeterio Betances (1827–1898), Puerto Rican politician and statesman. Logia Unión Germana, San Germán, Puerto Rico.
 Jackson Edward Betts (26 May 1904 – 13 August 1993), congressman from Ohio. Raised in Findlay Lodge No. 227, Findlay, Ohio, in 1931.
 Albert J. Beveridge (6 October 1862 – 27 April 1927), American historian and U.S. senator from Indiana. Member of Oriental Lodge No. 500, Indianapolis.
 James R. Beverley (15 June 1894 – 17 June 1967), U.S. lawyer and Attorney General of Puerto Rico. While serving as Attorney General, also served twice as acting governor of Puerto Rico.
 Howard Landis Bevis (19 November 1885 – 24 April 1968), seventh president of Ohio State University. Raised in McMakin Lodge No. 120, Mt. Healthy, Ohio, in 1911 and served as master of same in 1916.
 George M. Bibb (30 October 1776 – 14 April 1859), 17th U.S. Secretary of the Treasury and two-term member of the U.S. Senate. Was the first master of Russellville Lodge No. 17, Russellville, Kentucky, and was master of Hiram Lodge No. 4, Frankfort, Kentucky. He was also past master of Lexington Lodge No. 1 at Lexington, and served as secretary in 1804. In 1804 he was grand master of Kentucky.
 Thomas Bibb (8 May 1783 – 20 September 1839), second governor of Alabama from 1820 to 1821. Member of George Lodge No. 32, Warminster, Virginia.
 George Valentin Bibescu (1880–1941), Romanian aviation pioneer, Grand Master of Romanian Grand Lodge from 1911 to 1916
 Dana X. Bible (8 October 1891 – 19 January 1980), American football player, coach of football, basketball, and baseball, and college athletics administrator. Member of Mossy Creek Lodge No. 353, Jefferson City, Tennessee.
 Thomas Walter Bickett (28 February 1869 – 28 December 1921), 54th governor of North Carolina. Raised in Louisburg Lodge No. 413, Louisburg, North Carolina, on 2 October 1901, demitting to William G. Hill Lodge No. 218 at Raleigh in 1921. In 1917 he was grand orator of the Grand Lodge of North Carolina.
 Edward Biddle (1738–1779), American soldier, lawyer, and statesman from Pennsylvania. Was a delegate to the First Continental Congress in 1774 and 1775. Raised in Lodge No. 2, Philadelphia, on 29 March 1763.
 Benjamin Alden Bidlack (8 September 1804 – 6 February 1849), congressman from Pennsylvania. Raised in Lodge No. 61, Wilkes-Barre, Pennsylvania, on 1 May 1826.
 John Bidwell (5 August 1819 – 4 April 1900), California pioneer and politician. Raised in San Jose Lodge No. 10 in 1851 and later affiliated with Chico Lodge No. 111.
 Albert Bierstadt (7 January 1830 – 18 February 1902), German-American painter known for landscapes of the American West. Member of Holland Lodge No. 8, New York City.
 Timothy Bigelow (30 April 1767 – 18 May 1821), American lawyer. Grand master of the Grand Lodge of Massachusetts two terms, 1806–08 and 1811–13.
 Benjamin T. Biggs (1 October 1821 – 25 December 1893), 46th governor of Delaware. Member of Union Lodge No. 5, Middletown, Delaware.
 John Bigler (8 January 1805 – 29 November 1871), third governor of California. Initiated in Pacific Lodge, Long's Bar, Butte County, California, in 1850 and later a member of Tehama Lodge No. 3, Sacramento, and Washington Lodge No. 20, Sacramento.
 Louis Pierre Édouard, Baron Bignon (3 January 1771 – 1841), French diplomat and historian
 Theodore G. Bilbo (13 October 1877 – 21 August 1947), 39th and 43rd governor of Mississippi. U.S. senator from Mississippi. Raised 17 April 1899 in Claiborn Lodge No. 293 at Nashville, Tennessee, and affiliated with Sherrard Byrd Lodge No. 353 at Poplarville, Mississippi. Eventually suspended for non-payment of dues.
 William Billers, English haberdasher
 Henry Harrison Bingham (1841–1912), Union Army officer during the American Civil War, congressman from Pennsylvania. Chartiers Lodge #297, Canonsburg, Pennsylvania.
 Hiram Bingham III (1875–1956), American explorer, discovered the ruins of Machu Picchu. Hiram Lodge No. 1, Connecticut.
 Robert Worth Bingham (8 November 1871 – 18 December 1937), politician, judge, newspaper publisher and U.S. ambassador to the United Kingdom. Past master of Falls City Lodge No. 376 of Louisville, Kentucky. At a meeting of the Grand Lodge of England, in the presence of the King and 8,000 Masons, he was created a past senior grand warden of that grand lodge.
 Stanislav Binički (1872–1942), Serbian musician
 Leon Milton Birkhead (1885–1954), American Unitarian minister
 David B. Birney (29 May 1825 – 18 October 1864), Union general in the American Civil War. Initiated in Franklin Lodge No. 134 of Philadelphia on 31 October 1850.
 Francis Bischof (1904–1979), Queensland Australia Police Commissioner from 1958 to 1969
 Henry Bishop, English composer of "Home! Sweet Home!"
 George Bishop (21 August 1785 – 14 June 1861), English astronomer
 William Bizzell (14 October 1876 — 13 May 1944), fifth president of the University of Oklahoma and president of Agricultural and Mechanical College of Texas (now Texas A&M University)
 Sveinn Björnsson (27 February 1881 – 25 January 1952), first president of the Republic of Iceland. One of the founders of Edda Lodge in Reykjavik on 6 January 1919 under the authority of the National Grand Lodge of Denmark and was later Grand master of Iceland.
 Frank S. Black (8 March 1853 – 22 March 1913), American newspaper editor, lawyer and politician. Member of the U.S. House of Representatives from 1895 to 1897, and the 32nd governor of New York from 1897 to 1898. Raised in King Solomon's Primitive Lodge No. 91 of Troy, New York, and later affiliated with Roman Lodge No. 223 at Rome, New York.
 Hugo Black (1886–1971), Associate Justice of the Supreme Court of the United States (1937–1971). Birmingham Temple Lodge No. 836, Birmingham, Alabama.
 James D. Black (24 September 1849 – 5 August 1938), 39th governor of Kentucky. Grand master of Grand Lodge of Kentucky in 1888–89.
 John Black (12 November 1832 – 22 January 1838), politician from the U.S. state of Mississippi, most notably serving in the U.S. Senate as a Whig from 1832 to 1838. Member of Rising Virtue Lodge No. 7.
 John C. Black (27 January 1839 – 17 August 1915), U.S. congressman from Illinois; received the Medal of Honor for his actions as a Union Army lieutenant colonel and regimental commander at the Battle of Prairie Grove during the American Civil War. Member of Olive Branch Lodge No. 38, Danville, Illinois, and grand orator of the Grand Lodge of Illinois from 1894 to 1895.
 Lloyd Llewellyn Black (15 March 1889 – 23 August 1950), U.S. federal judge
 Samuel W. Black (3 September 1816 – 27 June 1862), lawyer, soldier, judge, and politician. Seventh governor of the Nebraska Territory. Killed in action leading his regiment in a charge early in the Civil War. Member of St. John's Lodge No. 219, Pittsburgh, Pennsylvania.
 Joseph Clay Stiles Blackburn (1 October 1838 – 12 September 1918), congressman and senator from Kentucky
 Luke P. Blackburn (16 June 1816 – 14 September 1887), 28th governor of Kentucky. Member of Landmark Lodge No. 41, Versailles, Kentucky.
 Robert E. Lee Blackburn (9 April 1870 – 20 September 1935), congressman from Kentucky
 Isaac Blackford (6 November 1786 – 31 December 1859), second Chief Justice of the Indiana Supreme Court. Member of Harmony Lodge No. 11 at Brookville, Indiana.
 Robert J. Blackham (16 September 1868 – 23 January 1951), author of Apron Men; The Romance of Freemasonry
 William W. Blackney (28 August 1876 – 14 March 1963), congressman from Michigan
 J. Stuart Blackton (5 January 1875 – 13 August 1941), Anglo-American film producer, considered the father of American animation. Member of Centennial Lodge No. 763, New York City.
 Ken Blackwell (1948–), American politician and activist, mayor of Cincinnati, Ohio, from 1979 to 1980 and Ohio Secretary of State from 1999 to 2007
 Ibra Charles Blackwood (21 November 1878 – 12 February 1936), 97th governor of South Carolina. Raised in Spartan Lodge No. 70, Spartanburg, South Carolina, 20 August 1903. Grand Lodge of South Carolina.
 James T. Blair Jr. (15 March 1902 – 12 July 1962), 44th governor of Missouri. Raised in Jefferson Lodge No. 43, Jefferson City, Missouri, 14 October 1925.
 John Blair Jr. (1732–1800), Associate Justice of the Supreme Court of the United States (1789–96), and Grand Master of Virginia from 1778 to 1784
 William Rufus Blake (1805 – 22 April 1863), Canadian stage actor. Member of Independent Royal Arch Lodge No. 2 of New York City.
 Sir Thomas Blamey (24 January 1884 – 27 May 1951), Australian field marshal, Chief Commissioner of the Victoria Police
 Mel Blanc (1908–1989), American voice actor. Mid Day Lodge No. 188, Oregon.
 Antonio Guzmán Blanco (28 February 1829 – 28 July 1899), three-time president of Venezuela
 Richard P. Bland (19 August 1835 – 15 June 1899), congressman from Missouri. Member of Rolla Lodge No. 213, Rolla, Missouri.
 Theodorick Bland (21 March 1741 – 1 June 1790), represented Virginia in both the Continental Congress and the U.S. House of Representatives. Present at Williamsburg Lodge No. 6 on 7 July 1778.
 William Thomas Bland (21 January 1861 – 15 January 1928), congressman from Missouri
 Henry G. Blasdel (29 January 1825 – 26 July 1900), first governor of Nevada. Member of Santa Cruz Lodge No. 38, Santa Cruz, California, and later past master of Carson Lodge No. 1, Carson City, Nevada.
 Samuel Blatchford (1820–1893), Associate Justice of the Supreme Court of the United States (1882–1893)
 Valentin Blatz (1 October 1826 – 26 May 1894), German-American brewer and banker. Founder of Blatz Beer. Member of Aurora Lodge No. 10, Milwaukee, Wisconsin.
 Cadwallader Blayney, 9th Baron Blayney (1720–1775), Grand Master of the Moderns from 1764 to 1767 and of Ireland in 1768
 Jesse Bledsoe (6 April 1776 – 25 June 1836), U.S. senator from Kentucky. Member of Lexington Lodge No. 1, Lexington, Kentucky, and past master of same. Grand Tyler of the Grand Lodge of Kentucky in 1808.
 Samuel T. Bledsoe (12 May 1868 – 8 March 1939), 16th president of Atchison, Topeka and Santa Fe Railway
 Harman Blennerhassett (8 October 1764 – 2 February 1831), Anglo-Irish lawyer and politician. Member of Harmony Lodge No. 1 at Natchez, Mississippi, among others.
 Archie Bleyer (12 June 1909 – 20 March 1989), American song arranger, bandleader, and record company executive. Member of St. Cecile Lodge No. 568, New York City.
 Edward Bligh, 2nd Earl of Darnley (9 November 1715 – 22 July 1747), Irish peer
 Aaron T. Bliss (22 May 1837 – 16 September 1906), congressman from and the 25th governor of Michigan. Member of Saginaw Valley Lodge No. 154 at Saginaw, Michigan.
 Antonio Blitz (21 June 1810 – 28 January 1877), magician who worked mainly in Europe and the United States. Honorary member of Montgomery Lodge No. 19 of Philadelphia.
 Timothy Bloodworth (1736 – 24 August 1814), U.S. senator from North Carolina
 Moses Bloom (1833–1893), Iowa politician
 Sol Bloom (9 March 1870 – 7 March 1949), congressman from New York
 Joseph Bloomfield (18 October 1753 – 3 October 1823), fourth governor of New Jersey. Raised in Bristol Lodge No. 25, Bristol, Pennsylvania, and served as master in 1782. He affiliated with Trenton Lodge No. 5, Trenton, New Jersey, in 1790 and in 1799-80 was Grand Master of the Grand Lodge of New Jersey.
 Sumner Blossom (25 June 1892 – March 1977), American magazine editor. Worked as editor for Popular Science magazine in the 1920s.
 Willie Blount (18 April 1768 – 10 September 1835), third governor of Tennessee. Member of Unanimity Lodge No. 54 of North Carolina.
 Gebhard Leberecht von Blücher (16 December 1742 – 12 September 1819), Graf (count), later elevated to Fürst (prince) von Wahlstatt, was a Prussian Generalfeldmarschall (field marshal) who led his army against Napoleon I at the Battle of the Nations at Leipzig in 1813 and at the Battle of Waterloo in 1815 with the Duke of Wellington. His original lodge is not known, but he was a constant visitor in the Lodge "Pax Inimicamalis" at Emmeriah in 1800–01, and in 1814 the Lodge "Archimedes" at Altenburg.
 Monte Blue (11 January 1887 – 18 February 1963), American silent movie actor. Member of Utopia Lodge No. 537 of Los Angeles.
 Robert D. Blue (24 September 1898 – 13 December 1989), 30th governor of Iowa. Mason, Shriner, member of Eastern Star and White Shrine.
 Fred H. Blume (9 January 1875 – 26 September 1971), Justice of the Wyoming Supreme Court for 42 years
 Elijah Boardman (7 March 1760 – 18 August 1823), U.S. senator from Connecticut. Member of Columbia Lodge No. 25 at Stepney, Connecticut, and in 1809 of Hiram Lodge No. 1, New Haven.
 Victor V. Boatner (6 May 1881 – 11 February 1950), American railroad executive
 Hiram Abiff Boaz (1866–1962), president of Polytechnic College from 1902 to 1911, and of Southern Methodist University from 1920 to 1922. Member of Granger Lodge No. 677, Granger, Texas. Grand Chaplain of the Grand Lodge of Texas in 1953.
 Manchester Boddy (1891–1967), rose from poverty to become the publisher of a major California newspaper and a candidate for Congress. Member of Craftsmen Lodge No. 559, Los Angeles.
 Johann Joachim Christoph Bode (16 January 1731 – 13 December 1793), German translator of literary works. Wrote extensively on Freemasonry and was one of the most distinguished Masons of his time. Member and Past Master of Lodge Absalem at Hamburg. Served as deputy grand master of the Grand Lodge of Hamburg.
 John Edward Courtenay Bodley (6 June 1853 – 28 May 1925), British civil servant. Member of Apollo University Lodge. 
 Joseph R. Bodwell (18 June 1818 – 15 December 1887), 40th governor of Maine. Member of Rockland Lodge No. 79, Rockland, Maine.
 Johann von Böber (22 December 1746 – 16 July 1820), German teacher, entomologist and botanist who was a Russian Royal Councilor of State. Grand master of the Grand Lodge of Russia from 1811 to 1814.
 Lewis V. Bogy (9 April 1813 – 20 September 1877), U.S. senator from Missouri. Member of Polar Star Lodge No. 79 of St. Louis, Missouri.
 Dimitrie Bolintineanu (1819–1872), Romanian poet, politician, 1848 revolutionary
 Simón Bolívar (1783–1830), leader of South American independence (initiated: Cádiz, Spain) Founding brother of Lodge Order and Liberty No. 2, Peru, 1824.
 Cezar Bolliac (1813–1881), Romanian politician, amateur archaeologist, journalist and Romantic poet
 Jérôme Bonaparte (15 November 1784 – 24 June 1860), youngest brother of Napoleon Bonaparte and served as Jerome I, King of Westphalia, between 1807 and 1813. Grand master of the Grand Orient of Westphalia.
 Joseph Bonaparte (7 January 1768 – 28 July 1844), elder brother of Napoleon Bonaparte, who made him King of Naples and Sicily (1806–1808), and later King of Spain (1808–1813, as José I). Appointed as grand master of the Grand Orient of France by Napoleon in 1805.
 Louis Bonaparte (2 September 1778 – 25 July 1846), brother of Napoleon Bonaparte and King of Holland (1806–10). Appointed Deputy Grand Master of the Grand Orient of France in 1805.
 Lucien Bonaparte (21 May 1775 – 29 June 1840), brother of Napoleon Bonaparte and a member of the Grand Orient of France
 Shadrach Bond (1773–1832), American politician, first governor of Illinois
 Thomas Bond (2 May 1712 – 26 March 1784), American physician and surgeon. In 1751 he co-founded the Pennsylvania Hospital, the first medical facility in the American colonies, with Benjamin Franklin. Deputy grand master of the Grand Lodge of Pennsylvania in 1749.
 Omar Bongo (1935–2009), president of Gabon
 Andrés Bonifacio (1863–1897), leader during Philippine Revolution from Spain. Taliba Lodge No. 165 under Gran Oriente Español (Spanish Grand Lodge).
 Nicholas Bonneville (13 March 1760 – 9 November 1828), French bookseller, printer, journalist, and writer; also a political figure of some relevance at the time of the French Revolution. In 1788 he published a book entitled The Jesuits driven from Freemasonry and their weapon broken by the Freemasons (translation). His theory was that the Jesuits had introduced the history of the life and death of the Templars into the symbolic degrees, and the doctrine of vengeance for the political and religious crime of their destruction.
 Ballington Booth (28 July 1857 – 5 October 1940), officer in the Salvation Army and a co-founder of Volunteers of America. Member of Montclair Lodge No. 144, New Jersey, about 1899, and later Charter Oak Lodge No. 249, New York City. He was past grand chaplain of the Grand Lodge of New York and member of York and Scottish rites as well as the Shrine.
 Edwin Booth (13 November 1833 – 7 June 1893), famous 19th-century American actor who toured throughout America and the major capitals of Europe, performing Shakespearean plays. Founded Booth's Theatre in 1869 in New York. Brother of John Wilkes Booth. Honorary member of the Masonic Veterans Association of New York.
 Felix Booth (16 July 1780 – 24 January 1850), English gin distiller
 Edward Bootle-Wilbraham, 1st Earl of Lathom (1837–1898), British politician. Member of Apollo University Lodge.
 Robert Borden (1854–1937), Prime Minister of Canada. St. Andrew's Lodge No. 1, Halifax, Nova Scotia.
 Gutzon Borglum (1867–1941), American sculptor, planned and started sculpture on Mount Rushmore. Raised in Howard Lodge No. 35.
 Lincoln Borglum (1912–1986), son of Gutzon Borglum; completed the Mount Rushmore project. Raised in Battle River Lodge No. 92.
 Ernest Borgnine (1917–2012), American actor. Abingdon Lodge No. 48; however, another source indicates Melrose Lodge No. 63, California.
 Solon Borland (21 September 1808 – 1 January 1864), newspaperman, soldier, diplomat, Democratic U.S. senator from Arkansas and a Confederate officer during the American Civil War
 Józef Boruwłaski (1739–1837), Polish-born dwarf who toured in European and Turkish courts. Raised to the 3rd degree in the city of Chester, England, on 15 November 1783.
 George Boscawen, 2nd Earl of Falmouth (8 July 1811 – 29 August 1852), British peer and member of Apollo University Lodge
 Sir Alexander Boswell, 1st Baronet (9 October 1775 – 27 March 1822), Scottish poet, antiquary and songwriter. Ex-officio provincial grand master of Ayrshire and master of Canongate-Kilwinning Lodge No. 2 in Edinburgh.
 James Boswell (1740–1795), British biographer, raised in Canongate Kilwinning Lodge at Edinburgh, 1759
 John Boswell (1532?–1609), 3rd Laird of Auchinleck. Considered by some scholars to be the first recorded non-operative Freemason. Present at a meeting of the (operative) Lodge of Edinburgh on 8 June 1600, and like his operative brethren, attested to the minutes by his mark.
 Pik Botha (1932–2018), South African politician
 Giovanni Bottesini (22 December 1821 – 7 July 1889), Italian Romantic composer, conductor, and a double bass virtuoso. Initiated 20 June 1849 in the Bank of England Lodge No. 263, London.
 Karl Böttiger (8 June 1760 – 17 November 1835), German archaeologist and classicist. Initiated in the Lodge of the Golden Apple, Dresden, on 8 November 1781.
 C. A. Bottolfsen (10 October 1891 – 18 July 1964), American politician from Idaho. 17th and 19th governor of Idaho. A member of Arco Lodge No. 48, Arco, Idaho, and a past district deputy grand master. Knight Templar and Shriner.
 Thomas Boude (17 May 1752 – 24 October 1822), the brick mason for Independence Hall in Philadelphia. First secretary of St. John's Lodge in Philadelphia which laid the cornerstone of the hall with Benjamin Franklin as grand master. Boude later became deputy grand master of the Grand Lodge of Pennsylvania.
 Elias Cornelius Boudinot (1 August 1835 – 27 September 1890), Cherokee attorney, politician and military officer. Delegate to the Arkansas secession convention, Boudinot served as a colonel in the Confederate States Army, and was elected as an Arkansas representative in the Confederate Congress. It is believed that Albert Pike conferred the 32° on him in 1886. He died 27 September 1890 and was buried with Masonic honors by Belle Point Lodge No. 20 of Fort Smith, Arkansas.
 Louis de Bourbon (15 June 1709 – 16 June 1771), Count of Clermont. Elected Grand Master of France 2 December 1743. It was during his grandmastership that the name was changed from the "English Grand Lodge of France" to the "Grand Lodge of France".
 Thomas E. Bourke (5 May 1896 – 9 January 1978), U.S. Marine Corps general who, during World War II, commanded Marine artillery units at the battles of Guadalcanal, Tarawa and Leyte. At the end of World War II, he commanded the 5th Marine Division in the occupation of Japan, and the Fleet Marine Force, Pacific.
 Augustus O. Bourn (1 October 1834 – 28 January 1925), American politician and the 36th governor of Rhode Island. Raised 18 May 1860 in What Cheer Lodge No. 21, Providence.
 Robin Bourne-Taylor, British rower and soldier. Member of Apollo University Lodge.
 Sir Mackenzie Bowell (27 December 1823 – 10 December 1917), PC, KCMG, English-born Canadian politician. Fifth prime minister of Canada. Raised in St. Lawrence Lodge No. 640 of Montreal in 1864. On 4 February 1897 he affiliated with Eureka Lodge No. 283 (Grand Lodge of Canada in Ontario), at Belleville, and was later a charter member of Moira Lodge No. 11 at Belleville. 
 William Bowen (1876 – 1965), British trade unionist and politician
 James Bowie (1796–1836), frontiersman, inventor of the Bowie knife. L'Humble Chaumiere Lodge No. 19, Opelousas, Louisiana.
 Oden Bowie (10 November 1826 – 4 December 1894), 34th governor of Maryland. Member of Centre Lodge No. 108, Baltimore.
 Henry L. Bowles (6 January 1866 – 17 May 1932), congressman from Massachusetts
 William Augustus Bowles (1763–1805), also known as "Estajoca", Maryland-born English adventurer and organizer of Native American attempts to create their own state outside of Euro-American control. Was "admitted an honorary member" of Prince of Wales Lodge No. 259, London, on 20 January 1791. He was made "Provincial grand master to the Creek, Cherokee, Chickasaw and Choctaw Indians" by the Grand Lodge of England.
 Frank Llewellyn Bowman (21 January 1879 – 15 September 1936), congressman from West Virginia
 Sir Leslie Boyce (9 July 1895 – 30 May 1955), K.St.J., Australian-born British Conservative Party politician. Lord Mayor of London between 1951 and 1952. Senior grand warden of the Grand Lodge of England in 1948.
 Robert Prettyman Boyce (c.18141888), member of the Texas Army, businessman and municipal official in Houston.
 William D. Boyce (1858–1929), founder of the Boy Scouts of America
 James E. Boyd (9 September 1834 – 30 April 1906), Irish-born American businessman and politician. Seventh governor of Nebraska. Member of Capitol Lodge No. 3, Omaha.
 William Boyd, 4th Earl of Kilmarnock (1704–1746), Jacobite politician, Grand Master of Scotland (1742–1743)
 Jean-Pierre Boyer (1776 – 9 July 1850), one of the leaders of the Haitian Revolution, and president of Haiti from 1818 to 1843. He was grand commander of the Supreme Council AASR of Haiti, 33°. Frequent visitor to Somerset Lodge No. 34, Norwich, Connecticut.
 Frank W. Boykin (21 February 1885 – 12 March 1969), congressman from Alabama. Scottish Rite, Shriner, and Eastern Star.
 Murrough Boyle, 1st Viscount Blesington (c. 1645–1718), first Grand Master of the Ancients, 1756–60
 Emerson R. Boyles (29 June 1881 – 30 November 1960), member of the Michigan Supreme Court from 1940 until 1956
 James S. Boynton (7 May 1833 – 22 December 1902), American politician and jurist. Served briefly as the 51st governor of Georgia. Member of St. John's Lodge No. 45, Jackson, Georgia.
 Paul Boyton (29 June 1848 – 19 April 1924), Irish showman and adventurer. Known as the "Fearless Frogman".
 William Brabazon, 11th Earl of Meath (1803 – 26 May 1887), Irish peer. Member of Apollo University Lodge.
 John Bracken (22 June 1883 – 18 March 1969), PC, 11th Premier of Manitoba
 Hugh Henry Brackenridge (1748 – 25 June 1816), American writer, lawyer, judge, and Pennsylvania Supreme Court justice. Member of Lodge No. 45, Pittsburgh.
 Theophilus Bradbury (13 November 1739 – 6 September 1803), congressman from Massachusetts. Justice of the Massachusetts Supreme Judicial Court.
 William Bradford (14 September 1755 – 23 August 1795), second U.S. Attorney General in 1794–1795. Member of Lodge No. 2, Philadelphia.
 Charles Bradlaugh (1833–1891), 19th-century atheist and Republican MP, Grand Lodge des Philadelphes, London (resigned his affiliation with English Freemasonry in 1874, but maintained an affiliation with a French Lodge)
 Henry D. Bradley (1893 – 14 December 1973), publisher of the St. Joseph News-Press; first member of the Bradley family which controls the News-Press & Gazette Company media company. Member of Sanford L. Collins Lodge No. 396 of Toledo, Ohio.
 James Bradley (1692–1762), English Astronomer Royal
 Omar Bradley (1893–1981), U.S. general. West Point Lodge No. 877, New York.
 Tom Bradley (1917–1998), American politician; mayor of Los Angeles, 1973 to 1993
 Willis W. Bradley (28 June 1884 – 27 August 1954), U.S. naval officer, recipient of the Medal of Honor, and congressman from California. Scottish Rite 32°, Knight Templar, and Shriner. President of National Sojourners.
 Donald Bradman (1908–2001), Australian cricketer. Initiated Lodge Arcadia No 177 UGLNSW on 11 June 1920.
 John Bradstreet (21 December 1714 – 25 September 1774), British Army major general who served during King George's War, the French and Indian War, and Pontiac's Rebellion. Also served as the Commodore-Governor for Newfoundland. Mason in Nova Scotia.
 Hugh Brady (29 July 1768 – 15 April 1851), American general from Pennsylvania who served in the Northwest Indian War under General Anthony Wayne, and during the War of 1812. Initiated 9 June 1797 in Lodge No. 22, Sunbury, Pennsylvania, and withdrew 15 January 1805.
 James H. Brady (12 June 1862 – 13 January 1918), U.S. senator and eighth governor of Idaho
 Johannes Brahms (1833–1897), German composer
 David Legge Brainard (21 December − 22 March 1946), American Arctic explorer and brigadier general. Member of Marathon Lodge No. 438, Marathon, New York.
 Thomas E. Bramlette (3 January 1817 – 12 January 1875), 23rd governor of Kentucky. Was Master of Albany Lodge No. 260, Albany, Kentucky.
 John Branch (4 November 17823 January 1863), U.S. senator, eighth Secretary of the Navy, 19th governor of North Carolina, and sixth and last territorial governor of Florida. Member of Royal White Hart Lodge No. 2, Halifax, North Carolina.
 Christoffel Brand (1797–1875), first speaker of the Legislative Assembly of the Cape Colony
 James T. Brand (9 October 1886 – 28 February 1964), 31st Chief Justice of the Oregon Supreme Court. A judge at the Nuremberg trials.
 William W. Brandon (5 June 18687 December 1934), 37th governor of Alabama. Member of Rising Virtue Lodge No. 4 at Tuscaloosa, Alabama.
 Samuel Brannan (2 March 18195 May 1889), American settler, businessman, journalist, and prominent Mormon who founded the California Star newspaper in San Francisco. Member of California Lodge No. 1 of San Francisco.
 Terry Branstad (17 November 1946 – ), 12th United States Ambassador to China, 39th and 42nd Governor of Iowa. Member and K.C.C.H. of the Des Moines Scottish Rite Valley. 
 John Brant (27 September 179427 August 1832), Mohawk chief and government official in Upper Canada. Member of Union Lodge No. 24, Ancaster.
 Joseph Brant (1743–1807), principal chief of the Six Nations people. Initiated in Lodge No. 417, 1776. First Master of Lodge No. 11, Mohawk Village (near Brantford) in 1798.
 Charles Wesley Brashares (18911982), American bishop of the Methodist Church and the United Methodist Church. Raised in Harmony Lodge No. 38, Gorham, Maine. Demitted.
 Thomas Brassey, 1st Earl Brassey (11 February 1836 – 23 February 1918), governor of Victoria, Grand Master of the United Grand Lodge of Victoria Member of Apollo University Lodge
 Alva J. Brasted (5 July 187627 May 1965), fourth Chief of Chaplains of the United States Army. Member of Sojourners Lodge No. 51, Washington, DC.
 Dimitrie Brătianu (1818–1892), Prime Minister of Romania (1881)
 Ion C. Brătianu (1821–1891), Romanian politician, three-time prime minister of Romania
 Sam G. Bratton (19 August 188822 September 1963), U.S. senator from New Mexico. Member of Clovis Lodge No. 40, Clovis, New Mexico, 32° Scottish Rite in Valley of Santa Fe, Ballut Abyad Shrine Temple in Albuquerque and member of the Order of DeMolay.
 Mason Brayman (23 May 181327 February 1895), American attorney, newspaperman, and Union Army brigadier general during the American Civil War. Seventh governor of the Idaho Territory. Member of Springfield Lodge No. 4 of Springfield, Illinois.
 David Brearley (1745–1790), signer of the U.S. Constitution on behalf of New Jersey. The first Grand Master of Masons for the state of New Jersey.
 John Breathitt (9 September 178621 February 1834), 11th governor of Kentucky. Member of Russellville Lodge No. 17 of Russellville, Kentucky.
 Daniel Breck (12 February 17884 February 1871), congressman from Kentucky and member of the Supreme Court of Kentucky. Served as Master of Richmond Lodge No. 25 in Richmond, Kentucky, and was Grand Master of Kentucky in 1827–28.
 John C. Breckinridge (16 January 182117 May 1875), 14th and youngest-ever Vice President of the United States. Expelled from the U.S. Senate after joining the Confederate Army. Member of Good Samaritan Lodge No. 174 at Lexington, Kentucky. Was suspended in 1861 and reinstated in 1871. Scottish Rite 33°.
 Robert Jefferson Breckinridge (8 March 180027 December 1871), politician and Presbyterian minister in Kentucky. He was a member of the Kentucky House of Representatives and Superintendent of Public Education in that state. Member of Lexington Lodge No. 1 in Lexington.
 William Campbell Preston Breckinridge (28 August 183718 November 1904), congressman from Kentucky. Member of Lexington Lodge No. 1 in Lexington and delivered the oration at the cornerstone laying of the Masonic Temple in Richmond, Virginia, in 1888.
 Robert Bree (1759–1839), English physician
 Ernest R. Breech (18971978), American corporate executive. Remembered for his work in revitalizing the Ford Motor Company in the years following World War II. Also served similar roles at Trans World Airlines and other companies. Raised in Austin Lodge No. 850, Chicago, and was the Sovereign Grand Inspector General of the Scottish Rite in Michigan.
 Edmund Breese (18 June 18716 April 1936), American stage and film actor of the silent film era. Member of St. John's Lodge No. 6, Norwalk, Connecticut.
 Sidney Breese (15 July 180027 June 1878), U.S. senator from Illinois, Chief Justice of the Illinois Supreme Court, Speaker of the Illinois House of Representatives, a forefather of Illinois, and "father of the Illinois Central Railroad". Member and Master of Scott Lodge No. 79, Carlyle, Illinois.
 Walter E. Brehm (25 May 189224 August 1971), congressman from Ohio. Member, Secretary, and Master of Mingo Lodge No. 171, Logan, Ohio.
 Anders Behring Breivik, arrested for 2011 Norway attacks. Was a member of Lodge St. Olaus T.D. Tre Søiler No. 8 in Oslo. Formally excluded (expelled) from Freemasonry in 2011.
 Lionel Brett (19 August 1911 – 10 September 1990), Nigerian jurist and member of the Supreme Court of Nigeria. Member of Apollo University Lodge.
 Sereno E. Brett (31 October 18919 September 1952), highly decorated brigadier general of the U.S. Army who served in both world wars. Member of Hancock Lodge No. 311, Fort Leavenworth, Kansas.
 Walter Breuning, world's oldest man at the time of his death of natural causes on 14 April 2011, aged 114 years, six months, twenty-five days. Member of Great Falls Lodge No. 118, Great Falls, Montana, for over 85 years.
 Earl L. Brewer (11 August 186910 March 1942), 38th governor of Mississippi
 Owen Brewster (22 February 188825 December 1961), U.S. senator, congressman, and 54th governor of Maine. Member of Penobscot Lodge No. 39, Dexter, Maine. Member of York Rite, Scottish Rite, DeMolay, and Shriner. When Harry S. Truman, a fellow senator, was grand master of the Grand Lodge of Missouri, Brewster spoke at the grand lodge session at Truman's request.
 Aristide Briand, Prime Minister of France. Initiated in the lodge Le Trait d'Union in July 1887 (not recorded). Declared "unworthy" by Le Trait d'Union on 6 September 1889. Joined in the lodge Le Chavalier du Travail, in Paris in 1895.
 John W. Bricker (6 September 189322 March 1986), U.S. senator and the 54th governor of Ohio. Member of Mt. Sterling Lodge No. 269, Mount Vernon, Ohio. York Rite, 33° Scottish Rite, and Shriner.
 John Bridges (1666–1724), English topographer
 Styles Bridges (9 September 189826 November 1961), 63rd governor of New Hampshire before a 24-year career in the U.S. Senate. Received the degrees in Morning Sun Lodge, Conway, Massachusetts, and later member of Eureka Lodge, No. 70, Concord, New Hampshire.
 Ansel Briggs (3 February 18065 May 1881), first governor of Iowa. Member of Nebraska Lodge No. 1, Bellevue, Nebraska.
 Frank A. Briggs (15 September 18589 August 1898), fifth governor of North Dakota. 32° Scottish Rite.
 Frank P. Briggs (25 February 189423 September 1992), U.S. senator from Missouri. Grand Master of the Grand Lodge of Missouri in 1957.
 Elbert S. Brigham (19 October 18775 July 1962), congressman from Vermont
 Geraldo Bright, English bandleader known as "Geraldo"
 James Jefferson Britt (4 March 1861-26 December 1939), congressman from North Carolina
 James Broadhead (29 May 1819 7 August 1898), congressman from Missouri and first president of the American Bar Association. Member of Tuscan Lodge No. 360 of St. Louis.
 Daniel Brodhead (17 October 173615 November 1809), American military and political leader during the Revolutionary War and early days of the United States. Member of Lodge No. 3, Philadelphia.
 Israel Brodie, Chief Rabbi of Great Britain and the Commonwealth, 1948–1965
 William A. Brodie, laid the foundation stone of the Statue of Liberty on 5 August 1884 as Grand Master of New York
 Kazimierz Brodziński (8 March 179110 October 1835), Polish Romantic poet
 Henry P. H. Bromwell (26 August 18239 January 1903), congressman from Illinois. Prominent Masonic author including Restorations of Masonic Geometry and Symbolry Being a Dissertation on the Lost Knowledges of the Lodge. Raised in Temperance Lodge No. 16, Vandalia, Illinois, in 1854 and was Master in 1856. Grand Master of the Grand Lodge of Illinois in 1864. Later moved to Colorado, where he affiliated with Denver Lodge No. 5. Grand Orator of Colorado in 1874. Member of York and Scottish Rites.
 Greene C. Bronson (17 November 17893 September 1863), Chief Justice of New York
 John R. Brooke (21 July 18385 September 1926), major general in the Union Army during the American Civil War and the Spanish–American War. Served as a military governor of Puerto Rico and governor of Cuba. Member of Columbia Chapter No. 21, R.A.M. Philadelphia.
 Robert Brooke (c. 176127 February 1800), tenth governor of Virginia. Member and Master of Fredericksburg Lodge No. 4 and became Grand Master of Virginia in November 1795.
 Walker Brooke (25 December 181318 February 1869), U.S. senator from Mississippi. Member of Hill City Lodge No. 121, Vicksburg, Mississippi.
 Bryant Butler Brooks (5 February 18618 December 1944), seventh governor of Wyoming. Member of Ashlar Lodge No. 10 at Douglas, Wyoming, and later of Casper Lodge No. 15, Casper, including past master. Grand orator of the Grand Lodge of Wyoming in 1940.
 Charles W. Brooks (8 March 189714 January 1957), U.S. senator from Illinois. Raised 24 January 1920 in Wheaton Lodge No. 269, Wheaton, Illinois. Grand Orator of the Grand Lodge of Illinois in 1946. Scottish Rite 33° and York Rite member.
 Henry Luesing Brooks (9 December 190530 December 1971), U.S. federal judge. Member of Louisville Lodge No. 400, Louisville, Kentucky.
 John Brooks (17521 March 1825), 11th governor of Massachusetts. Member of Washington Lodge No. 10 (Military) under Grand Lodge of Massachusetts.
 Overton Brooks (21 December 189716 September 1961), congressman from Louisiana. Raised in Joppa Lodge No. 362, Shreveport, about 1921. 32° Scottish Rite, Shriner and honorary member of National Sojourners.
 Stratton D. Brooks (10 September 187018 January 1949), third president of the University of Oklahoma and eleventh president of the University of Missouri. Member of Norman Lodge No. 38, Norman, Oklahoma. Member of Royal Arch and DeMolay.
 Jacob Broom (17 October 175225 April 1810), signer of the U.S. Constitution. Early member of Lodge No. 14, Wilmington, Delaware.
 Henry Brougham, Scottish abolitionist and founder of the Edinburgh Review. Raised in Fortrose Lodge, Stornoway, Scotland.
 J. Melville Broughton (17 November 18886 March 1949), 60th governor of North Carolina from 1941 to 1945. Member of Wake Forest Lodge No. 282.
 Aaron V. Brown (15 August 17958 March 1859), 11th governor of Tennessee and 17th U.S. Postmaster General. Junior Grand Warden of the Grand Lodge of Tennessee in 1825.
 Albert G. Brown (31 May 181312 June 1880), 14th governor of Mississippi. Member of Gallatin Lodge No. 25, Gallatin, Mississippi.
 Clarence J. Brown, newspaper publisher, Ohio politician, congressman
 Daniel Russell Brown (28 March 184828 February 1919), 43rd governor of Rhode Island
 Egbert B. Brown (4 October 181611 February 1902), Union general in the Trans-Mississippi Theater of the American Civil War. Member of Toledo Lodge No. 144, Toledo, Ohio.
 Fred H. Brown (12 April 1879 – 3 February 1955), 59th governor of New Hampshire
 Gustavus Richard Brown (17 October 174720 September 1804), one of the doctors summoned to attend to George Washington the night he died. One of the organizers of St. Columbia Lodge No. 10, Port Tobacco, Maryland, and was the fifth grand master of Maryland in 1797.
 Jacob Brown (9 May 177524 February 1828), Commanding General of the United States Army from June 1821 until his death. Received degrees in Ontario Lodge at Sackets Harbor, New York, and later a member of Watertown Lodge No. 49, Watertown, New York.
 Joe E. Brown (28 June 18916 July 1973), American film actor active from 1928 to 1964. Member of Rubicon Lodge No. 237, Toledo, Ohio, and of Al Malaikah Shrine in Los Angeles.
 John Brown (9 May 18002 December 1859), American who led an anti-slavery revolt in Harpers Ferry, Virginia in 1859. Freemason who later became an Anti-Mason.
 John Brown, represented Virginia in the Continental Congress and U.S. House of Representatives. Introduced the bill granting statehood to Kentucky and would become the first U.S. senator from that state. Member of Lexington Lodge No. 1, Lexington.
 John C. Brown (6 January 182717 August 1889), 19th governor of Tennessee and Confederate general. A member of Pulaski Lodge No. 101, Pulaski, Tennessee, and was Grand Master of the Grand Lodge of Tennessee in 1869.
 Norris Brown (2 May 18635 January 1960), U.S. senator from Nebraska
 Prentiss M. Brown (18 June 188919 December 1973), congressman and senator from Michigan. Member of St. Ignace Lodge No. 369, St. Ignace, Michigan. Received the Scottish Rite (Northern Jurisdiction) 33° in October 1955.
 Solomon G. Brown, first African American employee of the Smithsonian Institution
 Thomas Brown (24 October 178524 August 1867), second governor of Florida. Raised in Hiram Lodge No. 59 of Virginia in August 1807. Became a member of Jackson Lodge No. 1, Tallahassee, serving as secretary in 1833 and master in 1855. Grand Master of the Grand Lodge of Florida in 1849. Grand secretary of the Grand Lodge of Florida from 1834 to 1835.
 Vernon J. Brown (20 March 18748 April 1964), 45th lieutenant governor of Michigan
 Charles Farrar Browne (26 April 18346 March 1867), American humor writer, better known under his nom de plume "Artemus Ward". Received the Masonic degrees in Manhattan Lodge No. 62, New York City, in the fall of 1863.
 Edward E. Browne (16 February 186823 November 1945), congressman from Wisconsin
 Gordon Browning (22 November 188923 May 1976), 38th governor of Tennessee. Member of Huntingdon Lodge No. 106, Huntingdon, Tennessee.
 Charles B. Brownson (5 February 19144 August 1988), congressman from Indiana. Raised in Mystic Tie Lodge No. 398 of Indianapolis in 1950.
 Nathan Brownson (14 May 17426 November 1796), physician and statesman from Riceboro, Georgia. Delegate to the Continental Congress in 1777 and was governor of Georgia in 1781. Member of North Star Lodge of Manchester, Vermont.
 Blanche Bruce, former slave who became a U.S. senator from Mississippi
 Charles Bruce, 5th Earl of Elgin, Scottish nobleman, Grand Master of Scotland (1761–1763)
 James Bruce (1730–1794), British explorer. Canongate Kilwinning Lodge.
 Stanley Bruce, 1st Viscount Bruce of Melbourne (15 April 1883 – 25 August 1967), eighth Prime Minister of Australia, initiated in the Old Melburnians Lodge No. 317 UGLV
 Walter Bruchhausen (29 May 189211 October 1976), U.S. federal judge
 Wilber M. Brucker (23 June 189428 October 1968), 32nd governor of Michigan; sixth U.S. Secretary of the Army. Raised in Salina Lodge No. 155 on 15 September 1915 and later served as Master of that lodge.
 Henry Bruckner (17 June 187114 April 1942), congressman from New York
 Samuel von Brukenthal, baron of the Holy Roman Empire
 Clement Laird Brumbaugh (28 February 1863 – 28 September 1921), congressman from Ohio
 D. Emmert Brumbaugh (8 October 189422 April 1977), congressman from Pennsylvania. Member of Woodbury Lodge No. 539 at Roaring Spring, Pennsylvania. Scottish Rite and Shriner.
 Martin Grove Brumbaugh (14 April 186214 March 1930), 26th governor of Pennsylvania. Member of Mt. Moriah Lodge No. 300, Huntingdon, Pennsylvania.
 Avery Brundage (28 September 18878 May 1975), fifth president of the International Olympic Committee. Member of North Shore Lodge No. 937, Chicago. Scottish Rite and Shriner.
 Duke Ferdinand of Brunswick-Wolfenbüttel (12 January 17213 July 1792), German-Prussian field marshal (1758–1766) known for his participation in the Seven Years' War. Initiated in 1740 in the Lodge of the Three Globes in Berlin and received the degree of Master Mason in 1743 at Breslau.
 George W. Brush (4 October 184218 November 1927), captain of a black company in the 34th Infantry Regiment U.S. Colored Troops in the Union Army during the American Civil War; received the Medal of Honor
 Henry Brush (June 177819 January 1855), congressman from Ohio and member of the Supreme Court of that state
 Edward George Bruton (17 February 1826 – 3 August 1899), British architect. Member of Apollo University Lodge.
 William Jennings Bryan, American politician, congressman, U. S. Secretary of State and presidential candidate. Lincoln Lodge No. 19, Lincoln, Nebraska.
 Joseph R. Bryson (18 January 189310 March 1953), congressman from South Carolina
 Francis Scott, 2nd Duke of Buccleuch (11 January 169522 April 1751),  Scottish nobleman, Grand Master of the Grand Lodge of England (Moderns) in 1723
 Charles Montagu-Scott, 4th Duke of Buccleuch (24 May 177220 April 1819),  Scottish nobleman and 43rd Grand Master Mason of Scotland, 1800–1801
 10th Earl of Buchan (See Henry Erskine, 10th Earl of Buchan)
 11th Earl of Buchan (See David Erskine, 11th Earl of Buchan)
 12th Earl of Buchan (See Henry Erskine, 12th Earl of Buchan)
 John Buchan, 2nd Baron Tweedsmuir (25 November 1911 – 20 June 1996), British naturalist and adventurer. Member of Apollo University Lodge.
 James Buchanan, U.S. president, Lodge No. 43, Lancaster, Pennsylvania
 John P. Buchanan (4 October 184714 May 1930), 25th governor of Texas. Member of Charles Fuller Lodge No. 412, Rutherford County, Tennessee, which was later Mt. Moriah Lodge No. 18, of Murfreesboro.
 George Villiers, 2nd Duke of Buckingham (10 January 162816 April 1687),  English peer and statesman
 Frank Buckles, last living American veteran of World War I
 Alexander Buckner (8 March 17856 June 1833), U.S. senator from Missouri. First Grand Master of Indiana.
 Simon Bolivar Buckner (1 April 18238 January 1914), 30th governor of Kentucky. Listed as a Freemason in the Grand Lodge of Kentucky proceedings of 1891.
 John Charles Bucknill (25 December 1817 – 19 July 1897), English psychiatrist
 Frederick G. Budlong (10 July 188125 September 1953), bishop of the Episcopal Diocese of Connecticut from 1934 to 1950
 Buffalo Bill (See William F. Cody)
 Howard Buffett (13 August 190330 April 1964), congressman from Nebraska. Raised in Covert Lodge No. 11, Omaha.
 Harold R. Bull (6 January 18931 November 1976), U.S. Army lieutenant general
 Archibald Bulloch (1 January 173022 February 1777), third governor of Georgia. Member of Solomons Lodge No. 1, Savannah.
 William Bellinger Bulloch (17776 May 1852), U.S. senator from Georgia
 Charles Buls, mayor of Brussels
 Edward Bulwer-Lytton, 1st Baron Lytton, politician and writer
 Alfred L. Bulwinkle (21 April 188331 August 1950), congressman from North Carolina
 Edward Buncombe (17421778), plantation owner from the Province of North Carolina who served as a colonel in the Continental Army in the American Revolutionary War. He is the namesake of Buncombe County in western North Carolina. Member of Unanimity Lodge No. 7 at Edenton, North Carolina. His degree dates were 16 May, 26 May, and 3 June 1776.
 Charles E. Bunnell (12 January 18781 November 1956), federal judge for the United States Fourth Judicial Division, and the University of Alaska's first president, from 1921 to 1949
 John Bunyan (162831 August 1688), English writer and preacher best remembered as the author of the religious allegory The Pilgrim's Progress. Denslow wrote, "Although it is not known whether he was a Freemason or not, his little-known work Solomon's Temple Spiritualized contains so much Masonic phraseology and dogma that it would be hard to believe that he did not have some knowledge of the Craft."
 Luther Burbank, U.S. horticulturist, botanist, agricultural science pioneer; Santa Rosa Lodge No. 57
 Henry Burbeck (10 June 17542 October 1848), served in the U.S. Army for more than forty years, most notably during the Revolutionary War and the War of 1812; achieved the rank of brigadier general
 Thomas G. Burch (3 July 186920 March 1951), congressman from Virginia
 William Burdett-Coutts (20 January 1851 – 28 July 1921), British politician. Member of Apollo University Lodge.
 Clark Burdick (13 January 186827 August 1948), congressman from Rhode Island
 Usher L. Burdick (21 February 187919 August 1960), congressman from North Dakota. Member of Mt. Moriah Lodge No. 51, Williston.
 Gottfried August Bürger (31 December 17478 June 1794), German poet; initiated in 1775
 John Smith de Burgh, 11th Earl of Clanricarde, Irish peer
 Ulick de Burgh, 1st Marquess of Clanricarde (20 December 1802 – 10 April 1874), British politician. Member of Apollo University Lodge.
 William O. Burgin (28 July 187711 April 1946), congressman from North Carolina
 Andrew H. Burke (15 May 185017 November 1918), second governor of North Dakota. 33° Scottish Rite (Southern Jurisdiction).
 Arleigh Burke, U.S. admiral; Supreme Temple Architect (honored in 1997)
 Edmund Burke, Irish politician and philosopher
 Edward R. Burke (28 November 18804 November 1968), U.S. senator from Nebraska. Member of Omaha Lodge No. 288, Omaha, Nebraska.
 Elmer Burkett (1 December 186723 May 1935), U.S. senator and congressman from Nebraska
 Edwin C. Burleigh (27 November 184316 June 1916), 42nd governor of Maine. Member of Augusta Lodge No. 141, Augusta, Maine.
 Albert S. Burleson (7 June 186324 November 1937), 45th U.S. Postmaster General and congressman from Texas
 Edward Burleson (15 December 179826 December 1851), third vice-president of the Republic of Texas. Member of Clinton Lodge No. 54, Bolivar, Tennessee.
 Anson Burlingame (14 November 182023 February 1870), American lawyer, legislator, and diplomat. Member of Amicable Lodge, Cambridge, Massachusetts.
 Robert Burnaby, English explorer and businessman. First Past Master of Victoria Lodge No. 1085, District Grand Master (English) of British Columbia.
 Alexander Burnes (16 May 1805 – 2 November 1841), Scottish explorer and diplomat associated with the Great Game
 James Burnes (1801–1862), Scottish surgeon in India
 David G. Burnet, first president of the Republic of Texas (interim); Holland Lodge No. 1
 Jacob Burnet (22 February 177010 May 1853), early leading citizen and U.S. senator from Ohio. Deputy Grand Master of the Grand Lodge of Ohio in 1810–1812.
 William Burnet (13 December 17307 October 1791), American political leader and physician from New Jersey who served in the Continental Army and the Continental Congress. When the grand lodge of New Jersey chartered Nova Caesarea Lodge No. 10 at Cincinnati on 8 September 1791, he was named as first master.
 George H. Burnett (9 May 185310 September 1927), 21st Chief Justice on the Oregon Supreme Court
 James Burnett, Lord Monboddo (171426 May 1799), Scottish judge, scholar of linguistic evolution, philosopher and deist. The Bulletin of the International Masonic Congress (1917) stated that he was a Freemason.
 Frederick Russell Burnham, American-born Victorian adventurer known as the father of Scouting. Chief Commissioner, Excelsior Lodge No. 195.
 George Burnham (28 December 1868, 28 June 1939), congressman from San Diego
 Henry E. Burnham (8 November 18448 February 1917), U.S. senator from New Hampshire. Member of Washington Lodge No. 61, Manchester, was grand master of the Grand Lodge of New Hampshire in 1885, and was a 33° of the Scottish Rite.
 Bob Burns (2 August 18902 February 1956), American musical comedian. Invented the bazooka musical instrument from which the anti-tank weapon derived its name.
 Conrad Burns, U.S. senator from Montana
 Gilbert Burns (17601827), Scottish farmer and younger brother of Robert Burns, whose writings have contributed greatly to the bank of knowledge that exists regarding the life of his famous brother. Raised in St. James Lodge, No. 178, Tarbolton, 1 March 1786.
 Robert Burns, national poet of Scotland. St. David's Lodge No. 174, Tarbolton.
 George Burrington (168222 February 1759), governor of the Province of North Carolina from January 1724 to April 1725, and again from February 1731 to 1734. Member of the lodge at the "King's Arms on New Bond Street" in London, and his name also appears on the list of members of "Bear and Harrow in Butcher Roe", London, in 1730.
 Julius C. Burrows (9 January 183716 November 1915), congressman and senator from Michigan. Past master of Anchor Lodge of Strict Observance No. 87 at Kalamazoo and member of Kalamazoo Chapter, Royal Arch No. 13, and Peninsular Commandery No. 8, Knights Templar.
 Harold Hitz Burton, U.S. Supreme Court Associate Justice (1945–1958)
 Hutchins Gordon Burton (1744 or 178221 April 1836), 22nd governor of North Carolina. Member of Phalanx Lodge No. 31, Charlotte.
 John Hill Burton (22 August 180910 August 1881), FRSE, Scottish advocate and historian. Historiographer Royal (1867–1881). Made a Freemason in Glenkindil Lodge No. 333, Scotland, on 17 August 1827.
 Richard Francis Burton, English explorer
 Robert Burton (20 October 174731 May 1825), American Revolutionary War officer. Member of Hiram Lodge No. 24 of Williamsborough, North Carolina.
 Theodore E. Burton (20 December 185128 October 1929), congressman and senator from Ohio. Member of Iris Lodge No. 229, Webb Chapter, R.A.M., Orion Commandery, K.T. and Al Koran Shrine Temple, all of Cleveland.
 William Burton (16 October 17895 August 1866), 39th governor of Delaware. Member of Temple Lodge No. 9 and Deputy Grand Master of the Grand Lodge of Delaware from 1851 to 1852.
 Vannevar Bush, Worshipful Master of Richard C. Maclaurin Lodge (M.I.T. Lodge or Tech Lodge)
 Harlan J. Bushfield (6 August 188227 September 1948), 16th U.S. senator from and 16th governor of South Dakota. Member of St. Lawrence Lodge No. 39 at Miller, South Dakota.
 Asa S. Bushnell (16 September 183415 January 1904), 40th governor of Ohio. Served as company commander in 152nd Ohio volunteer infantry in American Civil War. Made "Mason at sight".
 George E. Bushnell (18871965), member of the Michigan Supreme Court from 1934 to 1955. Raised in Taylor Lodge No. 23 at Salem, Virginia, in 1909 and served as master of Sojourners Lodge No. 483 of Detroit in 1925. He received his 33° in 1924. Bushnell was a member of the Masonic Service Association European Committee sent abroad in 1945 to investigate the state of the Craft in Europe following the war.
 Anastasio Bustamante (27 July 17806 February 1853), three-time president of Mexico
 Benjamin Butler (5 November 181811 January 1893), 33rd governor of Massachusetts. Major general in the Union Army during the American Civil War.
 Charles C. Butler 18651946), Chief Justice, Supreme Court of Colorado. Initiated in Union Lodge No. 7, Denver, on 27 April 1935.
 David Butler (15 December 182925 May 1891), first state governor of Nebraska. Affiliated with Pawnee Lodge No. 23 at Pawnee City in 1879. His original lodge is not known.
 Hugh A. Butler (28 February 18781 July 1954), U.S. senator from Nebraska. Raised in Wellsville Lodge No. 194, Wellsville, Missouri, and later became a member of St. John's Lodge No. 25 of Omaha.
 John Butler (17281796), Loyalist who led an irregular militia unit known as Butler's Rangers on the northern frontier in the American Revolutionary War. He was probably raised in Union Lodge No. 1, Albany, New York, and became the first secretary of the famous St. Patrick's Lodge No. 8 at Johnstown, New York, which first met on 23 August 1766. In Canada, after the war, he became a charter member of St. John's Lodge of Friendship No. 2 and served as its master. He became the first grand senior warden of the Provincial Grand Lodge of Upper Canada. Barton Lodge No. 6 (then 10) had many of his former rangers as members, and Brant himself was at one time a member of this lodge.
 Peter Butler, British politician. Member of Apollo University Lodge.
 Richard Butler (general) (1 April 17434 November 1791), officer in the Continental Army in the American Revolutionary War, who later died fighting Indians in Ohio. He was initiated in Lodge No. 2, Philadelphia, on 14 April 1779, passed 20 April and raised 27 April. He later affiliated with Pennsylvania-Union Lodge, a lodge of the Pennsylvania line, and on 9 January 1787 is recorded as having been admitted to Lodge No. 45 of Pittsburgh. Lodge records show that he visited St. George's Lodge of Schenectady, New York, in June 1779 and later American Union Lodge (military).
 William M. Butler (29 January 186129 March 1937), U.S. senator from Massachusetts. Received degrees in Star in the East Lodge of New Bedford, Massachusetts, in 1886.
 Billy Butlin, British philanthropist
 Isaac Butt (6 September 18135 May 1879),  Irish barrister, politician, Member of Parliament. Member of Lodge No. 2, Dublin.
 George C. Butte (9 May 187718 January 1940), jurist, educator, and politician from Texas
 Daniel Butterfield, general of the Union Army during the American Civil War, Medal of Honor recipient and composer of the bugle call "Taps". Metropolitan Lodge No. 273, New York City.
 Sir Edward Buxton, 2nd Baronet (16 September 1812 – 11 June 1858), British politician. Member of Apollo University Lodge.
 Cyriel Buysse, Flemish nationalist writer
 Clovis E. Byers (5 November 189913 December 1973), U.S. Army lieutenant general who served in the Korean War and World War II. One-time commander of the 82nd Airborne. Received EA degree on 1 April 1923 in Laredo Lodge No. 547, Laredo, Texas, and the FC on 2 November 1925. Master Mason degree in Star of the East Lodge No. 650 in Yokohama, Japan, on 3 November 1947.
 George Byng, 6th Viscount Torrington (1768–1831), Royal Navy officer
 Harry C. "Curly" Byrd (12 February 18892 October 1970), president of the University of Maryland, College Park, from 1936 to 1954. Raised in Harmony Lodge No. 17, Washington, D.C., in 1914.
 Harry F. Byrd, governor of Virginia, U.S. senator from Virginia. Hiram Lodge No. 21, Winchester, Virginia.
 Richard E. Byrd, U.S. admiral. Initiated in Federal Lodge No. 1 and founded First Antarctic Lodge No. 777 in 1935.
 Frank M. Byrne (23 October 185824 December 1927), eighth governor of South Dakota
 James F. Byrnes, U.S. Supreme Court Associate Justice (1941–1942)
 Joseph W. Byrns Sr. (20 July 18694 June 1936), 46th Speaker of the United States House of Representatives. Member of Phoenix Lodge No. 131 and Cumberland Chapter No. 1, R.A.M. of Nashville, Tennessee.
 Joseph W. Byrns Jr. (15 August 19038 March 1973), one-term congressman from Tennessee. Member of Phoenix Lodge No. 131 of Nashville.
 John Byrom (29 February 169226 September 1763),  English poet and the inventor of a revolutionary system of shorthand. Listed as a member of a lodge held at The Swan in Long Acre, England, 1750.

C

 William H. Cabell (16 December 1212 January 1853), 14th governor of Virginia. Member of George Lodge No. 32, Warminster, Virginia.
 John L. Cable (15 April 188415 September 1971), congressman from Ohio
 Charles Wakefield Cadman (24 December 188130 December 1946), American composer. Member of Albert Pike Lodge No. 484, Los Angeles.
 S. Parkes Cadman (18 December 186412 July 1936), English-born American clergyman, newspaper writer, and pioneer Christian radio broadcaster of the 1920s and 1930s. Member of Independent Royal Arch Lodge No. 2, New York City, and was Grand Chaplain of the Grand Lodge of New York for 28 years.
 John Cadwalader (10 January 174210 February 1786), commander of Pennsylvania troops during the American Revolutionary War. Member of Lodge No. 8 in Philadelphia.
 Thomas Cadwalader (17071707), surgeon during the American Revolutionary War. Member of St. John's lodge of Philadelphia.
 Alessandro Cagliostro, Sicilian occultist
 1st Viscount Caldecote (See Thomas Inskip, 1st Viscount Caldecote
 William Musgrave Calder I (3 March 18693 March 1945), U.S. senator from New York
 Harmon White Caldwell (29 January 189915 April 1977), president of the University of Georgia in Athens from 1935 until 1948 and chancellor of the University System of Georgia from 1948 to 1964. Member of John W. Akin No. 537, Taylorsville, Georgia.
 Joseph Caldwell (21 April 177327 January 1835), first president of the University of North Carolina at Chapel Hill. Member of Eagle Lodge No. 19 of Hillsborough, North Carolina.
 Millard Fillmore Caldwell (6 February 189723 October 1984), congressman from and 29th governor of Florida. Member and past master of Santa Rosa Lodge No. 16, Milton, Florida, but was raised in a lodge in Macon, Mississippi.
 Richard Keith Call (24 October 179214 September 1862), third and fifth territorial governor of Florida. He joined Cumberland Lodge No. 8 at Nashville, Tennessee, in 1821 and later of Centerville Lodge No. 18, Leon County, Florida, of which he was master in 1851. In 1853 he affiliated with Concordia Lodge No. 28, Gadsden County, Florida. Assisted in the formation of the Grand Lodge of Florida in 1830 and was Grand Master in 1851.
 Plutarco Elías Calles (25 September 187719 October 1945), 40th president of Mexico. Member of Helios Lodge in Guaymas, Sonora.
 Jacques Calmanson (17221811), writer and physician
 Charles Alexandre de Calonne (20 January 173430 October 1802), French statesman. His lodge is not known, but he is recorded as a visitor to the Loge des Maitres at Amiens.
 Charles Calvert, 5th Baron Baltimore (29 September 169924 April 1751), British nobleman and Proprietary Governor of the Province of Maryland. Made a Mason about April, 1730 at Goodwood, West Sussex, England.
 Roberto Calvi (13 April 192017 June 1982), Italian banker and member of Propaganda Due, who was notable for his involvement with, and apparent suicide during, the Banco Ambrosiano scandal
 Ralph Henry Cameron (21 October 186312 February 1953), U.S. senator from Arizona. Member of Flagstaff Lodge No. 7, Flagstaff, Arizona.
 Simon Cameron (8 March 179926 June 1889), U.S. senator from Pennsylvania and 26th U.S. Secretary of War. Initiated in Perseverance Lodge No. 21 at Harrisburg, Pennsylvania, on 12 July 1826 and served as master in 1833.
 Albert Sidney Camp (26 July 189224 July 1954), congressman from Georgia
 Alexander William Campbell (4 June 182813 June 1893), Confederate States Army brigadier general during the American Civil War. Raised in Jackson, Tennessee, in June 1858 (lodge name and number not listed in Denslow).
 Archibald Campbell, 4th Baron Blythswood (25 April 187014 November 1929), British peer. Grand Master of the Grand Lodge of Scotland from 1926 to 1929.
 Doak S. Campbell (16 November 188823 March 1973), president of Florida State College for Women, as it made the transition from an all-female school under that name to the coeducational Florida State University, between 1941 and 1957. Raised in Buck Range Lodge, Howard County, Arkansas, and later a member of Jackson Lodge No. 1, Tallahassee, Florida. Served as grand orator of the Grand Lodge of Florida.
 Douglas Lloyd Campbell (27 May 189523 April 1995), 13th premier of Manitoba. He was initiated in Assiniboine Lodge No. 7 at Portage la Prairie, Manitoba, in 1917 and served as Master in 1922.
 George Washington Campbell (9 February 176917 February 1848), U.S. senator and congressman from Tennessee as well as ambassador to Russia and fifth Secretary of the Treasury. He served as master of Greenville Lodge No. 43, Greenville, Tennessee, and is also reported to have held offices in three other Tennessee lodges: Knoxville No. 2, Mount Libanus No. 59 and Tennessee No. 41, all of Knoxville.
 Jacob Miller Campbell (20 November 182127 September 1888), congressman from Pennsylvania and officer in the Union Army during the American Civil War. Became a member of Cambria Lodge No. 278 at Johnstown, Pennsylvania, on 26 October 1858, but demitted 13 April 1875 to become a charter member of Johnstown Lodge No. 538, serving as first senior warden.
 James Campbell (1 September 181227 January 1893), 16th U.S. Postmaster General. According to Denslow his blue lodge is not known, but he was a member of Harmony Chapter No. 52, Royal Arch Masons of Philadelphia.
 James Ulysses Campbell (29 August 186616 July 1937), 25th Chief Justice of the Oregon Supreme Court
 John Campbell, 2nd Marquess of Breadalbane, British politician, Member of Parliament (1820–1826, 1832–1834), Lord Chamberlain (1848–1852, 1853–1858), Grand Master of Scotland (1824–1826)
 John Campbell, 4th Earl of Loudoun (5 May 170527 April 1782), British peer and general of the British Army during the French and Indian War. Grand Master of the Grand Lodge of England in 1736. First Past Grand Master of England to visit a grand lodge in America, when on 31 January 1757 the Festival of St. John the Evangelist was postponed by the Provincial Grand Lodge in Boston so that he might attend.
 Sir Malcolm Campbell (11 March 188531 December 1948), British Army officer and racing motorist
 Thomas D. Campbell (18821966, industrialized corporate farming pioneer. Served as colonel with U.S. Air Corps from 1942 and made brigadier general in 1946. Raised in Acacia Lodge No. 4, Grand Forks, North Dakota, on 29 November 1907.
 Lord William Campbell (11 July 17304 September 1778), younger son of John Campbell, 4th Duke of Argyll. Colonial governor of both Nova Scotia (1766–1773) and South Carolina (1775).
 Sir William Campbell (2 August 175818 January 1834), Chief Justice of the Supreme Court of Upper Canada and a resident of Toronto. He was the founder of St. Andrew's Lodge No. 16 in Toronto.
 William Bowen Campbell (1 February 180719 August 1867), congressman from and 14th governor of Tennessee. Member of Lebanon Lodge No. 98, Lebanon, Tennessee.
 Joachim Heinrich Campe (29 June 174622 October 1818), German writer, linguist, educator and publisher. According to Denslow, "he was a learned and zealous Freemason as shown by his correspondence with Gotthold Lessing."
 Manuel Camus, Philippine senator. 12 October 1898, Zetland in the East Lodge No 508 Singapore, under the jurisdiction of the M. W. Grand Lodge of England.
 Edward Richard Sprigg Canby (9 November 181711 April 1873), career U.S. Army officer and a Union general in the American Civil War. According to Denslow he "was a member of a lodge in the East. His body was escorted under auspices of the Craft to the Masonic Temple at Yreka and afterwards conveyed East where he was buried with Masonic honors."
 Allen Daniel Candler (4 November 183426 October 1910), congressman from and 58th governor of Georgia. Member of Gainesville Lodge No. 219, Gainesville, Georgia.
 Gordon Canfield (15 April 189820 June 1972), congressman from New Jersey
 Ralph Canine (9 November 18958 March 1969), U.S. Army officer and first director of the National Security Agency (NSA). Raised in East Chicago Lodge No. 595, East Chicago, Indiana, in 1917.
 George Canning (11 April 17708 August 1827), Prime Minister of the United Kingdom from 10 April 1827 until his death. Member of Royal Somerset House and Inverness No. 4.
 Clarence Cannon (11 April 187912 May 1964), congressman from Missouri for over 40 years
 Joseph Gurney Cannon (7 May 183612 November 1926), 35th Speaker of the U.S. House of Representatives. Olive Branch Lodge No. 38 of Danville, Illinois.
 Newton Cannon (22 May 178116 September 1841), congressman from and eighth governor of Tennessee. Member of Cumberland Lodge No. 8, Nashville.
 Gheorghe Grigore Cantacuzino, prime minister of Romania
 James Cantey (30 December 181830 June 1874), Confederate States Army brigadier general during the American Civil War. Member of Kershaw Lodge No. 29, Camden, South Carolina.
 Eddie Cantor (c. 21 September 189210 October 1964), American "illustrated song" performer, comedian, dancer, singer, actor, and songwriter. Member of Munn Lodge No. 190, New York City.
 Homer Earl Capehart (6 June 18973 September 1979), U.S. senator from Indiana
 Luigi Capello (14 April 185925 June 1941), Italian Army officer during the First World War. According to Denslow, "Mussolini called on him to choose between Freemasonry and Fascism. He chose Freemasonry."
 William Theodotus Capers (18671867), bishop of the Episcopal Diocese of West Texas in the United States from 1914 until his death
 Arthur Capper (14 July 186519 December 1951), U.S. senator from and 20th governor of Kansas. Member of Orient Lodge No. 51 of Topeka.
 John Henry Capstick (2 September 185617 March 1918), congressman from New Jersey
 Emmanuel Carasso, Ottoman lawyer and politician, Grand Master of the Italian-rite Macedonia Risorta in Salonica
 Thaddeus Horatius Caraway (17 October 18716 November 1931), congressman and U.S. senator from Arkansas
 Ben Cardin (born 5 October 1943), U.S. senator from Maryland
 Giosuè Carducci (27 July 183516 February 1907), Italian poet and recipient of the Nobel Prize in Literature. The Bulletin of the International Masonic Congress of 1917 lists him as a Freemason.
 Henry Charles Carey (15 December 179313 October 1879), leading 19th-century economist of the American School of capitalism. He was raised in Lodge No. 3, Philadelphia, on 21 January 1817.
 1st Marquess of Carisbrooke See Alexander Mountbatten
 James Henry Carleton (27 December 18147 January 1873), Union general during the American Civil War. Raised in Montezuma Lodge No. 109 in New Mexico, chartered by the Grand Lodge of Missouri.
 Will Carleton (21 October 184518 December 1912), American poet
 Agostino Carlini (c. 171815 August 1790), Italian sculptor and painter, who was born in Genoa but settled in England. He was also one of the founding members of the Royal Academy in 1768. Member of the Lodge of Nine Muses No. 325 in London.
 Evans Carlson (26 February 189627 May 1947), U.S. Marine Corps brigadier general who served in both world wars
 Frank Carlson (23 January 189330 May 1987), congressman and senator from Kansas, and 38th governor of Kansas. Member of St. John's Lodge No. 113, Concordia, Kansas.
 George Alfred Carlson (23 October 18766 December 1926), 20th governor of Colorado
 Doyle Elam Carlton (6 July 188525 October 1972), 25th governor of Florida. Member of Hillsborough Lodge No. 25, Tampa.
 Carol II, King of Romania (1930–40)
 José Miguel Carrera, Chilean general and president St. John's Lodge No. 1, New York
 Charles Wynn-Carington, 1st Marquess of Lincolnshire, British politician, Member of Parliament (1865–1868), 1st Grand Master of New South Wales (1888–1891)
 Frank Carrington (13 September 18933 July 1975), co-founder in 1938 of the Paper Mill Playhouse in Millburn, New Jersey. Member of Hope Lodge No. 124, East Orange, New Jersey.
 Daniel Carroll (22 July 17305 July 1796), one of the Founding Fathers of the United States, and representative from Maryland in the 1st United States Congress. Member of Maryland Lodge No. 16, Baltimore.
 Thomas King Carroll (29 April 17933 October 1873), 21st governor of Maryland. Member of both Washington Lodge No. 3 and Concordia Lodge No. 13, both of Baltimore.
 Arthur J. Carruth Jr. (26 July 188729 September 1962), leading newspaperman and civic leader in Kansas for more than five decades
 Henderson Haverfield Carson (25 October 18935 October 1971), congressman from Ohio. Raised 21 February 1928 in Lathrop Lodge No. 676, Canton, Ohio.
 Kit Carson, American adventurer. Montezuma Lodge No. 109, Santa Fe, New Mexico.
 William Leighton Carss (15 February 186531 May 1931), congressman from Minnesota
 Jesse F. Carter (12 September 18735 November 1943), member of the South Carolina Supreme Court
 Jesse W. Carter (19 December 188815 March 1959), member of the Supreme Court of California. Raised in Western Star Lodge No. 2, Shasta, California, in 1914, serving as master in 1922 and senior grand steward of the Grand Lodge of California in 1922.
 Julius Victor Carus (25 July 182310 March 1903), German zoologist, comparative anatomist and entomologist. The bulletin of the International Masonic Congress lists him as a Freemason.
 Elbert Nostrand "Bert" Carvel (9 February 19106 February 2005), 61st and 64th governor of Delaware. Raised in Hope Lodge No. 4, Laurel, Delaware.
 Glover H. Cary (1 May 18855 December 1936), congressman from Kentucky
 Thomas Casady (18811881), Episcopal bishop in Oklahoma
 Pedro "Peter" Casanave (c. 1766 1796), merchant and politician. As Master of Georgetown Lodge No. 9 of Maryland (now Potomac No. 5 of D.C.) he laid the cornerstone of the White House.
 Giacomo Casanova, Venetian adventurer, "lodge of the Duke of Clermont", Paris, 1750
 Paul Foster Case, founder of the Los Angeles occult school, the Builders of the Adytum, Fairport Lodge No. 476, Fairport, New York
 Lewis Cass, U.S. politician and diplomat. American Union Lodge No.1, Marietta, Ohio. First Grand Master of the Grand Lodge of Michigan.
Bruce L. Castor, Jr. (b.1961), American lawyer and Republican politician from Montgomery County, Pennsylvania; acting Attorney General and first Solicitor General of Pennsylvania (2016). Raised January 7, 1992, Charity Lodge #190, Jeffersonville, Pennsylvania, 33rd Degree Scottish Rite (chosen at-large from PA), Knight Templar, Shriner A.A.O.N.M.S.
 Henry Cavendish, British scientist, best known for being the first to measure the density of the Earth, using the Cavendish experiment
 Ugo Cerletti, Italian neurologist
 Marc Chagall, Russian artist initiated in 1912 
 Thomas Chalmers, Lodge St. Vigean, 1800
 Joshua Chamberlain, commander of Union forces on Little Round Top during the American Civil War Battle of Gettysburg, and governor of Maine. United Lodge #8, Brunswick, Maine.
 Nicolas Chamfort, French writer, Loge des Neuf Jr, Paris
 Charles XIII of Sweden, King of Sweden and Norway
 Sir James Charles Chatterton (1794–1874), veteran of the Peninsular War and the Battle of Quatre Bras and the Battle of Waterloo
 Claire Lee Chennault, U.S. Air Corps major general; Commander of the "Flying Tigers" in WWII. League City Lodge No. 1053, League City, Texas.
 Victor Child Villiers, 7th Earl of Jersey, British banker, politician and colonial administrator, Grand Master of New South Wales (1891–1893)
 Esmé Chinnery (1886–1915), English soldier, cricketer, and pioneering military aviator. Initiated in the Apollo University Lodge, Oxford.
 Walter Chrysler, founder of Chrysler Corporation
 Lord Randolph Churchill, Winston Churchill's father, initiated 9 January 1871 in Churchill Lodge
 Winston Churchill, Prime Minister of the United Kingdom; 24 May 1901, Studholme Alliance Lodge No. 1591
 André Citroën, French engineer and motor-car manufacturer, Lodge La Philosophie, Paris
 Thomas Claiborne (1780–1856), American politician
 Mark W. Clark, U.S. Army general, Mystic Tie Lodge No. 398, Indianapolis
 Roy Clark, country music entertainer, Jenk's Lodge #497 – Jenks, Oklahoma
 Tom C. Clark, Associate Justice of the U.S. Supreme Court (1949–1967)
 William Clark, explorer, Lewis and Clark expedition. Saint Louis Lodge No. 111.
 John H. Clarke, associate U.S. Supreme Court justice (1916–1922)
 H. G. Michael Clarke (1898–1978), British educator and clergyman. Royal Somerset House & Inverness Lodge No 4, Royal Alpha Lodge No 16, Provincial Grand Master (Warwickshire), and Third Grand Principal (Royal Arch).
 Henry Clay, speaker of the U.S. House of Representatives and Grand Master of Kentucky
 Moses Cleaveland, founded the city of Cleveland, Ohio. Worshipful Master of Moriah Lodge in 1791.
 Patrick Cleburne, Confederate general in the American Civil War. Lafayette Lodge No. 189, Helena, Arkansas.
 Samuel Langhorne Clemens, also known as Mark Twain. American author. Polar Star Lodge No. 79, A.F.& A.M., St. Louis, Missouri. (Suspended for non-payment of dues and later reinstated 24 April 1867. Demitted October 1867, but recorded as having visited Carson City Lodge U.D. in February and March 1868.)
 DeWitt Clinton, governor of New York state, Grand Master of New York during the Morgan Affair, Holland Lodge No. 8, New York, 1790
 E. E. Clive, British stage and screen actor; Euclid Lodge, Massachusetts
 Jim Clyburn, congressman from South Carolina
 Harold Coates, Australian politician. Grand Master of New South Wales (1980–1985).
 Tyrus "Ty" Cobb, baseball star. Royston Lodge No. 426, Detroit.
 Howard Coble (1931–), member of the U.S. House of Representatives and Guilford Lodge number 656 AF&AM, Greensboro, North Carolina
 Mickey Cochrane, Baseball Hall of Famer
 Thomas Cochrane, 1st Baron Cochrane of Cults, British Unionist politician
 William F. Cody, a.k.a. Buffalo Bill, raised in Platte Valley Lodge No. 15, Nebraska
 George M. Cohan, Broadway star, raised in Pacific Lodge No. 233, New York City
 Francis Lyon Cohen, Chief Minister of the Great Synagogue in Sydney, Australia
 Harry Cohn, Pacific Lodge No. 233, New York
 Ernest E. Cole, Commissioner of Education of the State of New York (1940–1942)
 Nat King Cole, pianist and ballad singer
 Thomas Cole, English-born American artist, founder of Hudson River School. Amity Lodge No. 5, Zanesville, Ohio.
 Michael B. Coleman, American politician, mayor of Columbus, Ohio
 Neil Collings (1946–2010), English Anglican clergyman, and Dean of St Edmundsbury Cathedral. Earl of Mornington Lodge, London (UGLE), Grand Chaplain of UGLE, Third Grand Principal of Supreme Grand Chapter (Royal Arch) of England.
 Samuel Colt, manufacturer of Colt revolvers
 Émile Combes, French Prime Minister
 Spencer Compton, 7th Marquess of Northampton, Pro Grand Master, United Grand Lodge of England, 2001–2009
 Charlie Conacher, Canadian ice hockey player. Initiated in North Gate Lodge No. 591, Pickering, Ontario, in 1935.
 Marquis de Condorcet, French mathematician and philosopher, Lodges de Neuf Soeurs
 Chester Cooper Conklin (1886–1971), American comedian and actor. Raised 18 September 1916, University Lodge #394, California.
 Jess Conrad, entertainer, member of Chelsea Lodge No. 3098
 John Conyers Jr. (May 16, 1929 – October 27, 2019), American politician of the Democratic Party who served as a congressman for Michigan from 1965 to 2017. The longest-serving African-American in congressional history. Raised in Unity Lodge No. 28, Prince Hall Affiliated in Detroit.
 John Cook, Union general in the American Civil War
 Joseph Cook, sixth prime minister of Australia Initiated into Lodge Independent No 8 UGLNSW 12 February 1892
 Gordon Cooper, U.S. astronaut, member of Carbondale Lodge No. 82, Colorado
 Harry Corbett, puppeteer, magician, and pianist; creator of Sooty. Chevin Lodge, Yorkshire.
 Edward Henry Corbould, English artist, b. London 1815 d. London 1905
Edward Cornwallis
 Count Richard von Coudenhove-Kalergi (1894–1972), Austro-Japanese political activist, founder of Paneuropean Union. Initiated: Humanitas Lodge, Vienna, 1922. Left Humanitas in 1926.
 Walter William Covey-Crump (1865–1949), English Anglican priest, prelate of the Order of the Red Cross of Constantine (1927), Assistant Grand Chaplain of England (before 1936).
 Edith Cowan, first woman elected to Australian Parliament; member of St Cuthberts Lodge, Perth (Le Droit Humain)
 James Craik, Physician General of the United States Army
 Todd E. Creason, American fiction and non-fiction writer. Ogden Lodge No. 754, Illinois.
 Douglas Crick, English clergyman and Bishop of Chester
 Philip Crick, English clergyman and Bishop of Ballarat (Australia)
 Francesco Crispi, Prime Minister of Italy (possibly expelled in 1894?)
 Miron Cristea, Patriarch of the Romanian Orthodox Church (1925–39), Prime Minister of Romania (1938–39)
 Davy Crockett, 19th-century American folk hero, frontiersman, soldier and politician
 Ben Cross, British actor known for portraying Harold Abrahams in Chariots of Fire, and Sarek in Star Trek; Shakespear Lodge No 99 (London), initiated 2010, Grand Steward (UGLE) 2017.
 Aleister Crowley, English occultist, Anglo-Saxon Lodge No. 343, Paris (GLdF), 1904
 Abraham Curry, founding father of Carson City, Nevada. Masonic Lodge No. 1, Carson City.
 Admiral of the Fleet Sir Lucius Curtis, Provincial Grand Master for the Province of Hampshire from 1840 until his death in 1869
 William Cushing, U.S. Supreme Court Associate Justice (1789–1810), St. Andrews Lodge, Boston
 Alexandru Ioan Cuza, Romanian Domnitor of the Danubian Principalities, 1859–66

D

 Mark Dalby, British clergyman, Deputy Grand Chaplain of UGLE
 Bakari P. Dale, US Army Senior Advisor for Artificial Intelligence & Data Science, Civilian Senior Executive, Veteran Naval Officer & Aviator, Council Lodge No. 778, F.&A.M, Birmingham, Ala, MWPHGL of Alabama.
 James Broun-Ramsay, 1st Marquess of Dalhousie, British politician and colonial administrator, Governor-General of India (1848–1856), Grand Master of Scotland (1836–1838)
 David Dalrymple, Lord Hailes, Scottish judge and historian, Grand Master of Scotland (1774–1776)
 Sir Charles Dalrymple, 1st Baronet, British politician, Member of Parliament (1868–1906), Grand Master of Scotland (1893–1897)
 Eugene Goblet d'Alviella, Vice-chancellor of the Université libre de Bruxelles and Belgian senator
Charles Danby (1858–1906), actor, member of the Eccentric Lodge No. 2488
William Darell (1878–1954), British Army commander, and rower. Assistant Grand Master of UGLE. Studholme Lodge No 1591 and many others.
 Erasmus Darwin, English physician, philosopher, poet, grandfather of Charles Darwin. Member of Canongate Kilwinning Lodge No. 2, Edinburgh, Scotland.
 Jim Davidson, British comedian, Chelsea Lodge No 3098, London; Founding Master of British Forces Foundation (Lodge) No. 9725.
 William Richardson Davie, American politician and Grand Master of North Carolina from 1792 to 1798
 Freddie Davies, British comedian and actor, Chelsea Lodge No 3098, London
 Carol Davila, Romanian physician
 Norman Dawe, Canadian ice hockey and sports executive, member of the Elgin Lodge No. 7
 William Crosby Dawson, U.S. judge and politician, San Marino Lodge No. 34, F.&A.M, Greensboro, Georgia. Grand Master of Masons in Georgia from 1843 until his death in Greensboro on 6 May 1856.
 Charles De Coster, Belgian author
 Roger De Courcey, British ventriloquist, Chelsea Lodge No 3098, London
 Antonio De Curtis, also known as Totò, Italian actor. WM of Lodge Fulgor Artis, Rome.
 Isabelle Gatti de Gamond, pioneering Belgian secular educationalist and socialist activist
 Johann de Kalb, major general in the Continental Army during the American Revolutionary War. Pennsylvania Lodge No. 29.
 Polydore de Keyser, founding member and first Junior Warden, MacDonald Lodge, No. 1216
 Claude Joseph Rouget de Lisle, composer of "La Marseillaise"
 Sebastião de Melo, Marquis of Pombal, 18th-century Portuguese statesman
 William Ralph "Dixie" Dean, Everton and England footballer 1925–1937. Initiated in Randle Holme Lodge, No. 3261, Birkenhead, Cheshire, on 18 February 1931.
 Eugene V. Debs, American trade unionist, politician, and Socialist Party of America presidential candidate. Terre Haute Lodge No. 19.
 Ovide Decroly, Belgian educationalist. Initiated in Lodge Les Amis Philanthropes No. 2, Brussels, in 1902.
 Cecil B. DeMille, movie director; member of Prince of Orange Lodge No. 16, New York City
 Süleyman Demirel, 9th President of the Republic of Turkey. Bilgi Lodge No.015, Ankara. Grand Lodge of Turkey.
 Jack Dempsey, heavyweight boxing champion in 1919. Kenwood Lodge No. 800, Chicago.
 John Dennis (1931–2020), English clergyman; Bishop of St Edmundsbury & Ipswich. Rutlish Lodge No 4416 (London, then Surrey – lodge relocated).
 Laurence Dermott, painter, wine merchant and author. Grand Secretary, Ancients Grand Lodge, 1752–1771.
 John Theophilus Desaguliers, French-born British naturalist and scientist. Grand Master of the Premier Grand Lodge of England for the year 1719.
 Frédéric Desmons, Protestant priest who persuaded the Grand Orient de France to remove the term of the Great Architect of the Universe from their Constitution
 Willis Van Devanter, U.S. Supreme Court Associate Justice (1911–1937)
 Thomas E. Dewey, 47th governor of New York (1902–1971)
 Blaise Diagne, Senegalese political leader
 George Dickel (1818–1894), German-born American businessman
 Denver S. Dickerson, governor of Nevada
 Denis Diderot (1712–1784), French philosopher, writer and art critic
 John Diefenbaker, Prime Minister of Canada. Wakaw Lodge No. 166, Wakaw, Saskatchewan.
 Everett Dirksen, U.S. congressman and minority leader of the U.S. Senate
 Petar Dobrović, Serbian painter and politician
 Henry Dodge, U.S. senator from Wisconsin
 Bob Dole, U.S. politician Russell Lodge No. 177, Kansas
 Robert Dollar, Scottish-American industrialist and philanthropist
 Ed Doolan, U.S. radio presenter
 James Doolittle, U.S. general. Hollenbeck Masonic Lodge #319, Los Angeles.
 Ray Dorset, British singer-songwriter, member of Mungo Jerry. Chelsea Lodge No. 3098. 
 George Douglas, 16th Earl of Morton, Scottish politician, Lord High Commissioner (1819–1824). Grand Master of Scotland (1790–1792).
 Jim Douglas, governor of Vermont
 Stephen A. Douglas, U.S. senator, Lincoln–Douglas debates. Springfield Lodge No. 4, Grand Orator of Illinois Grand Lodge.
 Tommy Douglas, Canadian politician. Weyburn Lodge No. 20, Weyburn, Saskatchewan.
 William O. Douglas, U.S. Supreme Court Associate Justice (1939–1975)
 Alexander Douglas-Hamilton, 10th Duke of Hamilton, Scottish politician, Member of Parliament (1802–1806). Grand Master of Scotland (1820–1822).
 Hanson Dowell, Canadian ice hockey administrator and politician. Master at Ionic Lodge #73.
 Arthur Conan Doyle, British physician and author, creator of Sherlock Holmes
 Edwin Drake, U.S. oil industry pioneer. Oil Creek Lodge No. 3, Titusville, Pennsylvania.
 Francis Drake (antiquary), York doctor and historian. Grand Lodge of All England, York.
 Richard Dreyfuss, U.S. actor, made a Mason at Sight by the Grand Master of the Grand Lodge of the District of Columbia
 George Drummond, Scottish politician, Lord Provost of Edinburgh. Grand Master of Scotland (1752–1753).
 Gilbert du Motier, Marquis de Lafayette, French military officer who served as a general in the American Revolutionary War and a leader of the Garde Nationale during the French Revolution
 Juan Pablo Duarte, Dominican businessman, writer, political activist and ideological leader of the Dominican Republic's independence
 Jovan Dučić (1871–1943), Serbian poet, writer and diplomat
 George Dudley, Canadian ice hockey administrator and lawyer. Member of Caledonian Lodge 249.
 Robert Duff, British politician, Member of Parliament (1861–1893). Grand Master of New South Wales (1893–1895).
 Gerald du Maurier, actor and actor-manager. Green Room Lodge No. 2957, London (UGLE).
 Henry Dunant, founder of the Red Cross; shared the first Nobel Prize
 Thomas Dunckerley, ritualist and author, Lodge No 31, Portsmouth
 Lawrence Dundas, 1st Earl of Zetland
 Thomas Dundas, 2nd Earl of Zetland, Grand Master of Grand Lodge of England, 1844–70. Initiated in Prince of Wales' Lodge No. 259 in 1830.
 Colonel Sir Weary Dunlop (12 July 1907 – 2 July 1993), Australian World War II prisoner of war, surgeon 
 John Boyd Dunlop, Scottish inventor
 Alexander Roberts Dunn, first Canadian awarded the Victoria Cross
 Jimmy Dunn, Canadian sports executive and Hockey Hall of Fame inductee
 Herbert Dunnico, UK politician and Master of the New Welcome Lodge
 Joseph Duveen, 1st Baron Duveen, UK art dealer. Royal Colonial Institute Lodge No. 3556.

See also
 List of Freemasons (E–Z)

References

External links 
 Famous Freemasons in Worlds History - U ∴ S ∴ V ∴ N ∴ S ∴ S Regular Grand Lodge of Serbia, A.F. & A.M.

By Regular Masonic Lodges 
 
 
 
  (the oldest original or un-merged Masonic Lodge in the District of Columbia)
 
 
 
 
 

 A